Andrzej Grzegorczyk (22 August 1922 – 20 March 2014) was a Polish logician, mathematician, philosopher, and ethicist noted for his work in computability, mathematical logic, and the foundations of mathematics.

Historical family background

Andrzej Grzegorczyk's foundational family background has its origins in the Polish intellectual, religious, patriotic, and nationalist traditions. He was the only child to the Galician family of well-educated and wealthy parents, his father Piotr Jan Grzegorczyk (1894–1968) was a Polish philologist and historian of Polish literature involved in literary criticism, bibliographic studies, and chronicles of the Polish cultural life. Andrzej's mother Zofia Jadwiga née Zdziarska was a Medical Doctor from a purely Polish landed gentry family.

Rich historical family background was the most fundamental element in the shaping of Andrzej Grzegorczyk's intellectual formation and professional academic career. In particular, this heritage laid the foundations of his philosophical system which was a specific apologetics which mixed the Christian doctrine with certain elements of the Communist Ideology, the ecumenical approach towards both the Roman Catholic Church in Poland and the Russian Orthodox Church, the manifestly friendly attitude to the Eastern European countries and their national philosophers, and problems in the social assimilation in the Western European countries which served him at most for short time visits.

Education 

During the 1939–1944 Nazi–Soviet occupation of Poland in the course of the World War II, Grzegorczyk was a voluntary member of the Home Army, the dominant Polish resistance movement formed in February 1942 by the Union of Armed Struggle and other Polish partisans with allegiance to the Polish Government-in-Exile as the armed wing of the Polish Underground State. As an insurgent of the Warsaw uprising under the pseudonym Bułka, he provided a voluntary military service in the rank of Shooter in the 2nd Platoon of the Company Harcerska of the AK Battalion 'Gustaw' of the Róg Group of the Group Północ of the Home Army. As a result of the explosion of the Nazi heavy remote-control demolition layer Borgward IV of the Panzer Abteilung (Funklenk) 302 on 13 August 1944 at the Jan Kiliński street in the Warsaw Old Town, which killed more than 300 Polish partisans and civilians, he was injured in the legs and placed in a field hospital. Several days later he rejoined the division, but by the health condition he did not participate in the further fights and was forced to leave Warsaw on 31 August 1944 as a civilian in the evacuation by the city canals from the Warsaw Old Town to the Warsaw Śródmieście.

He got primary education at a private School of the Roman Catholic Educational Society Future, the same as for other Warsaw Uprising's insurgent a Polish politician Władysław Bartoszewski who under the pseudonym Teofil served to the Bureau of Information and Propaganda of the Headquarters of the Home Army in the rank of Corporal and in 1940–1941 was imprisoned in the Auschwitz concentration camp. Since 1938, Grzegorczyk had obtained the Polish secondary underground education at the 6th Tadeusz Reytan Lyceum in Warsaw to be matriculated in May 1940 on the day of France's capitulation. In order to be saved from being deported to Nazi Germany for a forced labour, he started another education at a chemical high school and then, when the Nazi authorities allowed vocational secondary education in the occupied Poland, at a 3-year chemical school localized on the area of the Warsaw University of Technology where in 1942–1944 he was taught by the professors of this university. At the same time, he completed a clandestine higher education at two then secret Polish universities – in physics at the University of Warsaw. At the stage of higher education, Grzegorczyk was especially attracted to logic by a broadcast lecture on stoic logic by a logician and mathematician Jan Łukasiewicz, who served as the Minister of Religious Denominations and Public Education of the Second Polish Republic in the 1919 government and in 1931–1932 was a rector of the University of Warsaw, and in May 1939 was elected a councillor of the Council of the City of Lwów as a representative of the Camp of National Unity based in the Sanation movement.

Practical exercises in mathematical logic were provided by Tadeusz Kotarbiński's student Henryk Hiż, who in the late 1930s was a member of the anti-Sanation Democratic Club, as an insurgent of the Warsaw Uprising in the rank of Second Lieutenant was imprisoned in a Nazi prisoner-of-war camp Oflag II D Gross-Born (Grossborn-Westfalenhof), after liberation by the 4th Infantry Division (Jan Kiliński) of the First Polish Army immigrated to the US, where in 1948 as Henry Thadeus Hiz got a doctoral degree at the Harvard University for a thesis An economical foundation for arithmetic supervised by a famous American philosopher Willard Van Orman Quine and worked for the University of Pennsylvania in Philadelphia. Logic was also lectured by a Roman Catholic priest and Christian philosopher Jan Salamucha. Psychology was taught by a Catholic priest Piotr Julian Chojnacki, historian of philosophy. Fine arts were lectured by a Polish art historian Michał Marian Walicki, who worked at the Department of Polish Architecture of the Warsaw Technical University in 1929–1936 and at the Academy of Fine Arts in Warsaw in 1932–1939 and 1945–1949, was awarded by the Officer's Cross of the Order of Polonia Restituta in 1947 and in 1949 was arrested and imprisoned till 1953 on the grounds of both false accusations and a fabricated evidence.

One of Grzegorczyk's underground teachers was a philosopher of science and culture Bogdan Suchodolski, a professor at the Chair of Pedagogy of the Jan Kazimierz University of Lwów since 1938, a professor at the University of Warsaw in 1946–1970 and a member of the PAU since 1946, since 1952 a member and in 1965–1970 a deputy of scientific secretary and in 1969–1980 a member of the presidium of the PAS, in 1953–1973 the chairman of the Committee on Education Studies of the PAS, the head of the Department of History of Science and Technology of the PAS for 1958–1974 and the founding director of the Institute of Pedagogical Sciences at the Faculty of Education of the University of Warsaw for 1958–1968, since 1968 a member of the Front of National Unity (FJN), in 1983 a member of its successor the Patriotic Movement for National Rebirth (PRON) created to demonstrate unity and support for the communist Poland's both government and governing party Polish United Workers' Party (PZPR) in the aftermath of the 1981–1983 martial law in Poland with a crucial role of a Polish centrist political party Alliance of Democrats and a pro-communist secular Roman Catholic organization PAX Association which in 1949 formed a publishing house Instytut Wydawniczy "Pax", in 1985–1989 a member and a Senior Marshal of the communist Poland's Parliament, in 1982–1989 the chairman of the National Council of Culture created by the martial law's main author Wojciech Jaruzelski.

Grzegorczyk was able to complete his originally underground education only after the World War II finished. Already in 1945 at the Philosophical Faculty of the Jagiellonian University in Kraków, supervised by a renowned philosopher of physics Zygmunt Michał Zawirski who in 1938–1939 was the Faculty's dean and in 1937 relocated to Kraków after uninterrupted nine years as the head of the Chair of Theory and Methodology of Sciences of the Adam Mickiewicz University in Poznań and investigated the problems on the borderline of philosophy and physics, Grzegorczyk finished the first higher study by a magister degree in philosophy with the thesis The Ontology of Properties, wherein with a help of Kotarbiński's reism, also propagated by Henryk Hiż, in the formal version by Stanisław Leśniewski, he successfully presented an interpretation of Leśniewski's elementary ontology as a theory of higher logical types. Soon after graduation, he got a postgraduate scholarship targeted to the study logic and the foundations of mathematics at the University of Warsaw, and on 26 May 1950 by examinations in philosophy and chemistry he completed a doctoral degree in mathematics with the thesis On Topological Spaces in Topologies without Points supervised by a famous mathematician Andrzej Stanisław Mostowski, in 1954 awarded by Knight's Cross of the Order of Polonia Restituta and in 1963 elected a real member of the PAS, who after the World War II also supervised Rasiowa's both master and doctoral theses in logic and the foundations of mathematics.

All the aforementioned teachers, both underground and post-war, by their teaching style and general attitude very deeply impacted onto Grzegorczyk's youthful mind. In his later years, the influence was strictly reflected by his various life choices, individual mental features, overall academic career both inside and outside Poland, both style and methods of research and teaching work. What is much more fundamental for his creativity, this impact straightforwardly shaped his personal world view which paradoxically mixed the ideas being in a deep mutual opposition, and resulted in the creation of a borderline philosophical system based on discrimination against the features of a human mind which are either inborn or beyond a personal choice.

Academic career

In 1946–1948, he was an assistant to Władysław Tatarkiewicz, and, since at this time Tatarkiewicz was the editor-in-chief of the first Polish philosophical journal Przegląd Filozoficzny (Philosophical Review), he served also as the secretary of the editorial board. In 1948, he submitted a paper on the semantics of descriptive language to the 10th International Congress of Philosophy in Amsterdam, but, similarly to most Polish philosophers invited by the organizers or submitting papers, he did not get passport and could not participate in this event, although his abstract was included in the proceedings. This fact was the omen of a difficult political time, and at this time logic focused attention of many Polish philosophers, young Grzegorczyk selected the way of majority. Soon after completion of the doctoral degree, he was employed by the Institute of Mathematics of the PAS and after 3 years he completed qualification procedure to a docent position on the basis of a book Some Classes of Recursive Functions, what at this time was an equivalent of the habilitation procedure. From 1950–1968, he worked at a secondary employment for the Faculty of Mathematics and Mechanics of the University of Warsaw, in 1957 he was awarded by the Stefan Banach Prize of the Polish Mathematical Society, in 1961 he was appointed an associate professor of mathematics. In 1963, along with Andrzej Mostowski and Czesław Ryll-Nardzewski, he participated in the famous logical conference The Theory of Models at the University of California, Berkeley where he met Alfred Tarski and where his both individual research results and research results co-authored with Mostowski and Ryll-Nardzewski were the subjects of few lectures. When a famous Dutch logician Evert Willem Beth died in 1964, the University of Amsterdam offered him the position of the head of the chair after Beth, he came to Amsterdam for few months and returned to Warsaw because he could not find a mental place for himself in the Netherlands, at this time on the eve of the cultural revolution which made Amsterdam the 'magic centre' of Europe. Also in 1967 he lectured for four months at the University of Amsterdam and was appointed a member and an assessor to the Division of Logic, Methodology and Philosophy of science and Technology of the International Union of History and Philosophy of Science, while in 1970 he lectured two months at the Sapienza University of Rome. In 1960, he contributed a philosophical essay to the festschrift volume to honor Władysław Tatarkiewicz on the occasion of his 70th birthday anniversary, whereas his father contributed Tatarkiewicz's bibliography to this volume. In the aftermath of the March 1968 Polish political crisis, as a result of a long-lasting confirmed direct involvement into the anti-governmental oppositional actions such like signing every open letter against restriction onto freedoms under communist regime, the inconvenient political circumstances motivated him to leave the University of Warsaw for the Institute of Mathematics of the PAS, where, in the 1960s, he was appointed the head of the Department of Foundations of Mathematics after Andrzej Mostowski left this position and remained the head of the Chair of Foundations of Mathematics at the University of Warsaw. In 1972, he was appointed a Full Professor, in 1973 he organized the pioneering semester in mathematical logic at the Stefan Banach International Mathematical Center of the Institute of Mathematics of the PAS, also known as the Banach Center and formed in January 1972 by the mutual agreement between the PAS and the Bulgarian, Czechoslovak, East German, Hungarian, Romanian, and Soviet national academies of sciences, which started the 1973–1992 cyclic three-to-four-month long lectures and allowed both the logicians and philosophers of the isolated Eastern Bloc to interact with their Western colleagues. In 1974, by mutual agreement he left the Institute of Mathematics of the PAS for the Institute of Philosophy and Sociology of the PAS to work at the Section of Logic then headed by a model theorist Ryszard Wójcicki who founded the series "Trends in Logic" and related conferences by the institute's oldest journal Studia Logica: An International Journal for Symbolic Logic, and to become the head of the Section of Ethics since 1982.

On the other hand, he was well known as an active member the Roman Catholic Church in Poland, in 1964 as one of the first Poles he appeared in the French commune Taizé, Saône-et-Loire, Burgundy to associate with an ecumenical Christian monastic group known as the Taizé Community, and this visit initiated the systematic contacts of the Polish Catholic intellectuals with this ecumenic group. He was a member of the Warsaw branch of the Club of Catholic Intelligentsia, particularly he was appointed a deputy president in 1972–1973 and a member of the government in 1973–1974 and 1976–1978, formed in 1956 after the Gomułka Thaw to stimulate independent thought and inform Polish Catholics on the Catholic philosophy in the countries outside the Eastern Bloc. Starting the 1970s, he practiced independent ecumenical activities, in particular the dialogue with the Russian Orthodox Church in Poland for which he organized encounters between the Polish Catholic intellectuals the Russian Orthodox intellectuals at his own apartment, which in the late 1970s and the early 1980s was also the location for the lectures of the Flying University organized by the Society of Scientific Courses (TKN). His model of the Catholic-Orthodox ecumenism found a good realization in the collaboration with the Russian Orthodox priest Alexander V. Men of Moscow, an eminent chaplain of independent Russian intellectuals who was murdered in 1990. He was a dedicated supporter of Russia and Ukraine, he felt that the Soviet Union was his second home, he actively collaborated with many Soviet and Russian scholars and claimed that Russians and Poles have a similar expression of the world and many in common by the culture. Among the anti-communist oppositionists in the Polish academia, he was well known as both supporter and propagator of the philosophy of nonviolence, a fight without making use of any kind of violence, and as the spiritual masters he followed the teachings of the leader of Indian nationalism Mahatma Gandhi, the leader in the civil rights movement Martin Luther King Jr. who got the 1964 Nobel Peace Prize, as well as both Henryk Hiż and his mentor Tadeusz Kotarbiński, who in 1958–1968 was a deputy chairman to the All-Poland Committee of the Front of National Unity of the communist Poland under first Aleksander Zawadzki and then Edward Ochab.

Censorship in the Polish People's Republic strictly blocked public information on Grzegorczyk, and, similarly to other Polish mathematician Stanisław Hartman of the University of Wrocław who got the Stefan Banach Prize in 1953, already in 1977 his name was enlisted for the strengthened control of the censorship. Every attempt of popularization of his name in the mass media (daily press, radio, TV, socio-political magazines) was immediately signalized to the directors of the central office of the state censorship directly controlled by the authorities of the communist party which then governed Poland. The censorship rules made exception solely for the publications in the specialist press, academic journals, and university lecture notes. However, as compared to the aforementioned famous case of Hartman, he had never been involved into a real political activity, such like direct supporting of anti-governmental student protesters, membership in oppositionist organizations, membership in a political party. Hence, he almost completely smoothly came through the communist period of Polish statehood and avoided the various unpleasant circumstances produced by the state authorities and services against their ideological enemies in the Polish academia, which usually included regular persecutions and repressions by sudden often brutal hearings, firing from a university teacher's job, ban on public lectureship, forced political emigration, internment during the period 1981–1983 of the martial law in Poland. Similarly to Hartman, for his oppositionist activity he was "exiled" from his alma mater to the Institute of Mathematics of the PAS. However, he always placed his personal intellectual development on the top priority, and made professional advancements both inside and outside the communist fatherland, particularly in 1979 he was elected a member of the International Institute of Philosophy (IIP) in Paris, France with respect to which he did not hide the critical views.

After the pioneering Revolution of 1989 in Poland, he was celebrated as an intellectual authority of the post-communist Republic of Poland. He was appointed a corresponding member of the PAU in Kraków after its finally successful restoration in 1989, and an active member of the Section of Philosophy of the Scientific Society of the KUL. In 1990, he took an early retirement and enhanced his organizational activity for the Polish philosophical academia as a director of research grant The Hundred Years of the Lwów–Warsaw School, within which there he organized a huge conference in Warsaw and Lvov on the occasion of Kazimierz Twardowski's centenary as the head of a chair at the former Jan Kazimierz University of Lwów, and translation of his book to Ukrainian language. In 1995, he was elected the chairman of the editorial board of the restored weekly Przegląd Filozoficzny. In 1997, under the rationale "for his outstanding merits to the Polish science" President Aleksander Kwaśniewski awarded him by the Knight's Cross of the Order of Polonia Restituta. In 1999–2003, he was both the first ever honorary member and the chairman of the Committee of Philosophical Sciences of the PAS, the Polish state body responsible for coordination and giving opinions on philosophical activities as well as analysis of philosophical publications and teaching programs in Poland. In 2011–2014, he was a member of the Committee of Ethics in Science of the PAS whose purpose is the diagnosis of ethical consciousness of Polish scientific community and recommendations for its improvements. In 2010, he was awarded by the honorary doctorate of the Blaise Pascal University, Clermont-Ferrand, France, whereas in 2013 he was awarded the honorary doctorate of the Jagiellonian University in Kraków . Finally, under the rationale "for his outstanding achievements in the scientific and didactic work, for his merits to the development of science and the activity for the democratic transformations in Poland" in 2014 President Bronisław Komorowski posthumously decorated him by the Officer's Cross of the Order of Polonia Restituta.

Legacy

Mathematical logic and mathematics 
Both inside and outside Poland he was most known for continuation of the Interwar period's intellectual traditions of the Lwów–Warsaw school of logic, in particular with the substantial help of Grzegorczyk and other Andrzej Mostowski's student Helena Rasiowa, as well as independently Alfred Tarski's student Wanda Szmielew, Warsaw rejoined the chart of the worldly foundational studies. He shared the view of Tarski and Mostowski that logical investigations should respect deductive sciences, in particular, mathematics, and was skeptical in the matter of a value of investigations, developed by Łukasiewicz's school, which looks for the shortest logical axioms or the simplest axiomatic bases of various logical systems. It is important to notice that a role of both Grzegorczyk and Rasiowa for earlier unpublished work in computable analysis by Stanisław Mazur, a member of the Polish United Workers' Party who was a member of communist Poland's Parliament in 1947–1956 and the director of the Institute of Mathematics of the University of Warsaw in 1964–1969 awarded by the Officer's Cross of the Order of Polonia Restituta in 1946, the Stefan Banach Prize in 1949, and the Order of the Banner of Work in 1951 and 1954, who investigated nonlinear functional analysis and Banach algebras and who in 1936–1939 elaborated the concept of computable real numbers and functions along with Stefan Banach. It is well known that Mazur was unfortunate in extension of his pre-war work to general computable mathematical objects, and the results were successfully assembled and published only in 1963 just under edition of Grzegorczyk and Rasiowa, what had a comparatively small influence on development of computable analysis, but developed careers of both the editors at the University of Warsaw.

Among his achievements in logic, one can find the issues of computability and decidability such like recursive functions, computable analysis, axiomatic arithmetic, and concatenation theory. On the other hand, he made research in the system of logics such like logical axioms, axiomatic geometry, non-classical logics, and interpretations of logic where, in particular, he defended psychologism since the beginning of his research. His two famous articles of 1958 and 1961 co-authored with Andrzej Mostowski and Czesław Ryll-Nardzewski became the starting point for research in the axiomatic second-order arithmetic and the arithmetic with an infinite conclusion rule, in particular the 1958's paper introduces the second-order arithmetic formalized in the first-order logic wherein both numbers and number sets are taken into account. He contributed research of the fundamental importance for theoretical computer science and precursory for the computational complexity theory, in 1953 he described and investigated classes of recursive functions generated by superposition, restricted recursion and the restricted minimum operation from some prescribed basic functions which contain addition and multiplication, and satisfy the condition that every class in question includes more complicated primitive recursive functions, and he got the sub-recursive hierarchy which fills the class of primitive recursive functions and is named the Grzegorczyk hierarchy. This originally recursion-theoretic hierarchy takes into account a strictly increasing infinite sequence of classes of functions of which the sum is a class of primitive recursive functions considered earlier, the n+1-th level functions are generated by iteration of the n-th level functions the number of times indicated by one of the arguments and by the closure under primitive recursion scheme bounded from above by an already defined function.

In 1964–1968, he researched relational and topological semantics for the intuitionistic logic, what in the context of the famous work due to J.C.C. McKinsey and Alfred Tarski was also a semantics for modal logic. Inspired by Paul Joseph Cohen's notion of forcing and Evert Willem Beth's semantics for intuitionistic logic, on the basis of the Heyting arithmetic and Jaśkowski's formulation of the intuitionistic propositional calculus, he proposed the model theory for the intuitionistic logic of constant domains (CD) and found a modal formula which is valid in all partially ordered frames with descending chain condition but not in all topological spaces. Because the logic resulting from this semantics includes the intuitionistically unprovable Grzegorczyk's schema , where x is not free in a sentence A, it is stronger than intuitionistic predicate logic. He proposed the semantics as a "philosophically plausible formal interpretation of intuitionistic logic" independently of the near-contemporary work by an American philosopher and logician Saul Aaron Kripke, observed that his semantics validates the schema and modified the forcing relation for disjunctions and existential formulas to give an exact interpretation for intuitionistic predicate logic. Sabine Koppelberg née Görnemann first in her doctoral dissertation of 1969 proved completeness of a calculus related to Grzegorczyk's semantics by both Kripke's tableau method and an algebraic method which made use of a language with the logical symbols, and then in 1971, with independent results by Dieter Klemke in 1970–1971 and Dov Gabbay in 1969, proved that addition of the scheme to intuitionistic predicate logic is sufficient to axiomatize Grzegorczyk's logic. Grzegorczyk's model theory has a fixed constant domain and represents a static ontology, whereas Kripke's model theory involves a quasi-ordered set of classical models, where the domains can expand along the quasi-ordering, and represents an expanding ontology with new objects created in a growth of knowledge. In other words, Grzegorczyk's semantics for the intuitionistic predicate logic is the class of predicate Kripke's models which have constant domain function. In particular, Krister Segerberg was the first who proposed for this emerging specific system of a modal logic the name Grzegorczyk's logic and the symbol S4Grz or S4.Grz, whereas George Boolos contributed the foundational investigation of Grzegorczyk's schema in the context of proof theory and arithmetic.

In 2005, Grzegorczyk gave a new proof of the undecidability of the first-order functional calculus without making use of Gödel's arithmetization, and, moreover, demonstrated undecidability of a simple concatenation theory, the operations of matching two texts understood as sequences of symbols into one text with the next text being a continuation of the first one. Grzegorczyk's undecidability of Alfred Tarski's concatenation theory is based on the philosophical motivation claiming that investigation of formal systems should be done with a help of operations on visually comprehensible objects, and the most natural element of this approach is the notion of text. On his research, Tarski's simple theory is undecidable although seems to be weaker than the weak arithmetic, whereas, instead of computability, he applies more epistemological notion of the effective recognizability of properties of a text and relationships between different texts. In 2011, Grzegorczyk introduced yet one more logical system, which today is known as the Grzegorczyk non-Fregean logic or the logic of descriptions (LD), to cover the basic features of descriptive equivalence of sentences, wherein he assumed that a human language is applied primarily to form descriptions of reality represented formally by logical connectives. According to this system, the logical language is equipped in at least four logical connectives negation (¬), conjunction (∧), disjunction (∨), and equivalence (≡). Furthermore, he defined this propositional logic from scratch, argued that neither classical propositional logic nor any of its non-classical extensions can be applied as an adequate formal language of descriptions, whereas the paradoxes of implication and equivalence are due to classical logic's restricting itself to considering only one, admittedly the most important, parameter of the content of a claim, namely its truth value. He rejected all the classical logical tautologies except the law of contradiction and added two logical axioms: (LD1): ≡ represents an equivalence relation and obeys the appropriate Extensionality property, that is equal descriptions can be substituted for each other, and (LD2): ≡ joins some of the Boolean properties of descriptions, such like associativity, commutativity, and idempotency of ∧ and ∨, distributivity of ∧ over ∨, distributivity of ∨ over ∧, involution of ¬ that additionally satisfies the De Morgan laws. His results in the concatenation theory and the propositional calculus with the descriptive equivalence connective provided an important addition to his signal achievements.

By his investigations in psychologism, he converted the paradox of Eubulides into a positive theorem (formally proved): an ideal human tackling a linguistically properly stated problem is able to think on this consistently, sincerely and fully consciously. In opposition to Alfred Tarski and other anti-psychologist logicians who taught that the natural language leads to contradiction by its very nature, he rejected this conviction and proposed a formal system of the Universal Syntax which imitates the versatility of colloquial language. On his approach, the axiomatization of quotation-operator is the best device which allows to marry logic with metalogic and prove the adequacy theorem for the notion of truth. He dealt with the problem on invasion of logic by postmodernity, because the deconstruction of logical rules is not at stake, there would be no logic, while the foundation of logic could be rocked. Despite that in the mathematical genealogy he was and a son of Andrzej Mostowski and a grandson of Alfred Tarski, he manifestly undermined and rebutted the classical anti-psychologism of modern logic. His best known logico-mathematical book is An Outline of Mathematical Logic: Fundamental Results and Notions Explained with All Details published in Polish in 1961 and in English in 1969. His book Fonctions Récursives became the standard handbook at the French universities. His other book Zarys arytmetyki teoretycznej (An Outline of Theoretical Arithmetic) became the basis for the Mizar system by the University of Białystok's team of a notable computer scientist Andrzej Trybulec. In Poland, Grzegorczyk was the first who popularized logical calculus by the book Logika popularna (Popular logic), also translated into Czech in 1957 and Russian in 1965, and the problems of decidability theory by the book Zagadnienia rozstrzygalności (Decidability problems).

He studied computable real numbers, in particular provided few different definitions of these numbers and the ways to development of mathematical analysis based only on these numbers and computable functions determined on these numbers. He investigated computable functionals of higher types and proved undecidability of different weak theories such like elementary topological algebra, he considered axiomatic foundations of geometry by the means of solids instead of points, he showed that mereology is equivalent to the Boolean algebra, he approached intuitionistic logic with a help of semantics of intuitionistic propositional calculus built upon the notion of enforced recognition of sentences in the frames of cognitive procedures, what is similar to the Kripke semantics which was created parallelly, and he studied Kotarbiński's reism. He proposed an interpretation of the Leśniewski ontology as the Boolean algebra without zero, and demonstrated the undecidability of the theory of the Boolean algebras with the operation of closure. He investigated intuitionistic logic, just a modal interpretation of the Grzegorczyk semantics for intuitionism, which predetermined the Kripke semantics, leads to the aforementioned S4.Grz. He sought logic as a vivid area placed in the mainstream of the European philosophy, and, although that he belonged to rather hermetic Lwów–Warsaw School of thought, in opposition to his intellectual masters and academic mentors he contributed the approach to logic by the means of psychology. For him, logic is a collection of principles which preserve the emphatic declarations of the majority of properly educated and free from either violation or corruption people, that is, he attributes logic to a perfect human mind formed as a result of ideal educational background, ideal upbringing process, and ideal propriety. On his idealist views, classical logic is a formal theory of existence lexicalized by the existential quantification, and all that is logical is nothing but a text. As a fervent follower of the classical Aristotelian attitude, he sought logic not only as the fundamental tool but also as the basic ontology wherein semantics dealing with human utterances is preceded by attributes of humankind such like rationality, life, and existence. In his methodological approach, logic lays the foundations of science and the overall European invention.

Philosophy and ethics 

In the field of philosophical logic he defended the ontological interpretation of the logical laws, on the basis of his personal belief on describing the world by these laws. In a straightforward opposition to the teachings by the fathers-founders of the twentieth-century European transcendentalism a German logician Gottlob Frege and an Austrian phenomenologist Edmund Husserl, thanks to which anti-psychologism also known as logical realism or logical objectivism dominated both the common understanding of logic and the formal reasoning in logic, he defended psychologism which he approached as a thesis about dependence of the relationship of meaning and determination on the human factor and its description attributed to a human behavior, what in itself was very far from continental philosophy and appropriate to an English Enlightenment philosopher John Locke and a British utilitarianist philosopher John Stuart Mill who was criticized by Husserl for the logical psychologism. According to Grzegorczyk's interpretation, any description is in a language of someone and done for someone, whereas logic is applied to describe the world strictly. As a result of such an approach, he produced the reinterpretation of the semantic antinomies which claims on limitations of applicability of concepts rather than self-contradiction of a language. Particularly, in the book Logic – a human affair, by the style appropriate to Tarski, he discussed with anti-psychologism and presented the formal construction of the Universal Syntax which led him to the hypothesis to say that a sentence A is true is equivalent to the statement of this sentence relativized to the domain wherein one applies the sentence A which trivializes the notion of truth, but he also stated that "the proof of this trivialization is trivial". On his approach, the liar paradox, which lays the foundations of this construction, transforms the antinomy into the hypothesis on both the human nature and human condition: 'there is a problem about which a human can not think in an accordant, sincere, and fully conscious way, that is having full awareness of the recognized and unrecognized sentences. Hence, in his fervent battle for psychologism, he linked formal logic to rather non-universal and subjective attributes of a human mind, and, moreover, claimed that anti-psychologist interpretation of meaning is inspired by the related idealist vision of the world as formed by ideally formed intellectuals. According to Grzegorczyk, independently on personal motivations for which one makes considerations, the criterion of the value of these considerations is logic, strictly speaking if a proof is logical, systematic, and self-conscious. Grzegorczyk approached logic as the morality of speech and thought, he sought in logic the foundations of moral discussions, and, therefore, made a straightforward cultivation of discrimination fully appropriate to the German idealists – he did not see a morality beyond a selected system and claimed the selected model of morality is the universal one. Despite that he conceived just logic by wide horizons, included the methodology of science into its foundations and claimed that logic is a basic component of the intellectual attitude which he identified with the European Rationalism, he limited both logic by rationalism and rationalism by logic. His model of rationalism is open to the realm of values, acquirable for a reliable knowledge, and advocates ethics in social relations, whereas logic appears therein as a pure attribute of a human mind – a rational European human. He fought for psychologism in logic, for him semantic relations are always relations for someone and are mediated by language. Consequently, paradoxes demonstrate the limits of concepts and systems rather than inconsistencies of a language.

Furthermore, he contributed a series of writings in philosophical anthropology and ethics in the methodological framework of philosophy which he named rationalism open for values, which was basically no more than a mixture of the Christian theology and the selected teachings of the Lwów–Warsaw school, and for which he developed the selected ideas of the Marxist thought in the context of theology and philosophy. The best example of the latter context is his book Mała propedeutyka filozofii naukowej (Short propedeutics of scientific philosophy) issued by the aforementioned pro-communist Catholic publisher Instytut Wydawniczy "Pax" on the eve of the fall of communism in Poland in December 1989, when the Marxist-Leninist references were removed from the July 1952 Constitution of the Polish People's Republic and the country was renamed to the Republic of Poland, the dissolution of the PZPR in late January 1990 by its last First Secretary Mieczysław Rakowski and the dissolution of the Warsaw Pact on 1 July 1991 in Prague. However, Grzegorczyk yet in his 1989's book fully and fervently developed the crucial ideas of the Marxist ideology, where in particular the name "scientific philosophy"' is not equal to philosophy of science understood as the standard philosophical discourse and is reserved to the unique significance of the ideological deformation of philosophy. The ideological misuses of the word "scientific" in the context of Marxism-Leninism are well-known: "scientific world view" is equal to the Marxist world view, "scientific religion" is equal to the Marxist-Leninist atheism, "scientific art" is equal to socialist realism also known as socrealism, while "scientific philosophy" is simply the synonym of both dialectical materialism and historical materialism – just making use of the term "scientific" was making the ideology. Indeed, similarly to ecumenism between different religions, this book, which met a devastative criticism by the Roman Catholic clerical scholars such like a Salesian metaphysicist Andrzej Maryniarczyk of the KUL, under the brightly banners of "pure philosophy" and "uniform approach to philosophy which can be the basis of teaching" proposed no more than an ideological uniformity of philosophy without a division onto the subjective branches such like Thomism, Existentialism or Platonism in order to get the alleged advantage of "maximal objectivity" of philosophy, where Grzegorczyk approaches philosophy as merely a convention based on the alleged values such like "seriousness" and "sincerity" claimed by him as the determinants of quality of philosophizing. He did not give the explicit definitions of these alleged merits, but provided some crucial hints on what is "serious and sincere philosophy": the most general thoughts and insights concerning the world and human life, systematic cognitive activity leading to construction of a philosophical world view, the philosophical views of brilliant writers and even scholars of other disciplines who in the margins of their specialty sometimes made interesting general considerations, amateur general reflection on any topic, professional statements which give very systematic and well exhaustive reflection, texts printed in special philosophical journals, and teachings of university professors. He introduced three categories of philosophers: amateur, traditionalists and professionals, where the only latter one can be performed in the "scientific" way, that is with a help of natural science and mathematics, but he did not make a difference between a speculation attributed to amateurs and a theoretical approach attributed to philosophy understood as an academic discipline, and, for this reason, made philosophy a part of the collectivist people's culture. The crucial element of his approach is the concept of reality divided onto observable reality formed by "objects (things) of different properties, joined by relations, creating different sets" by learning of which "we attribute certain properties to them and combine them into sets", and unobservable reality "composed of some separate things (...) with certain properties", where he attempted to apply his variant of dialectical materialism to justify an undefined materialistic spiritualism usually attributed to the Marxist-Leninist atheism. Comparatively, in his other book Życie jako wyzwanie (Life as a challenge), published already in 1993 when the primary socio-economic-political transformations were just implemented in the restored Republic of Poland almost free of the fallen Soviet occupation, he presented an unambiguously liberalized ontological declaration '''the world (...) contains objects (...) having various properties, connected by various relations, and belonging to various sets'. From a general philosophical point of view, this book resorted to all the basic notions such like good and evil as the links of the first semantic chain, that is the central ontological notion of an object with the notion of a state of affairs, and his analysis went further precisely along the second ontological chain, that is towards the notions of case and act. In general, the whole book reflected its author's full both conformity with and loyalty towards the economic-political transition, started with the 1990 Polish presidential election which made the leader of the anti-communist opposition and the 1983 Nobel Peace Prize laureate Lech Wałęsa the first freely elected President of the Third Republic of Poland, although until 2007 Lustration in Poland the Polish state authorities did not require a political either purge or thaw or at least a humble self-criticism among the Polish academia, and, moreover, until 2005 the successors of the PZPR – the Social Democracy of the Republic of Poland (SdRP) in 1991 and the Democratic Left Alliance (SLD) in 1999 – governed by Aleksander Kwaśniewski who won the 1995 presidential elections over Lech Wałęsa to be the 3rd President for 1995–2005 and to be instrumental in introduction of Poland into the North Atlantic Treaty Organization (NATO) in 1999 and the European Union in 2004 along with his party comrades Józef Oleksy, Włodzimierz Cimoszewicz, Leszek Miller, and Marek Belka, who were the Prime Ministers of Poland for 1995–1996, 1996–1997, 2001–2004, and 2004–2005 respectively.

In the matter of philosophical anthropology, on the basis of the ways of reasoning pivotal for the development of the European philosophy, he provided the systematic analysis of mutual relationships between the forms of thinking and cognition in the context of the beginnings of the European culture, gave precise description of the phenomenon of European rationalism, where rational means successful as well as efficient and well-founded, through joining this concept to the internal flow of intellectual life of the European civilization and to a specific literary topos, that is a place where this way of intellectual life is localized. Meanwhile, in the matter of ethics, he claimed that in a mind cleaned from egoism and disciplined by logic there should appear elements of a general human axiology whose presence in a human expression needs a deep ethical shock, experience of either own or others' strong testimony. Particularly, he sought it in the context of Christianity where cultivated saints are the sinners who came through the stage of a great internal conversion metanoi which principally demolished their earlier life's rules, and pointed out that this procedure was unsuccessfully attempted to be implemented on the area of a secular communist society. He specifically criticized mathematicians, thus including himself, by claiming that sometimes seeing on the might of mathematical brains focused on abstract problems it seemed that there is a satanic force which causes that the most able intellectually individuals are paid for the works meaningless for wellness of humans. By his ethics, he manifestly argued against his own life choices and looked for psychological either self-defense or justification, particularly he claimed that scientists are employed in an intellectual circus whenever they do not try to think on what really is worthy to do, and, for this reason, in the isolated intellectuals there should emerge a remorse and the will of more dedicated participation in realization of socially important tasks of either a country or the world, because quite well-paid mathematical games are a waste of energy which could be utilized for thinking on real actions having a good purpose. In the case of natural scientists, he claimed that they present a world view in a careless way, although by their scientific authority and reference to a concrete research they get a substantial expertise in general philosophic beliefs, but by propagation of unfriendly ways they propagate absence of precision because they avoid logical constructions of proofs in favour of a better visual impact. He sought logic as the method against epistemological particularism, for example, he claimed that a world view demands logical culture and analytic-philosophic insight, and the way against an intellectual trapping, for example, he had a radical and unpopular point of view that the only formal logic can be the security for language against the issues of a system of assessment by clear extracting, indicating and ordering. In his philosophy, a human condition is a free existence restricted by the various limitations. Accordingly, a human as an animal has the specific features, such like persistent enrichment of life quality, creation of an environment, sensitivity on values, spiritual sphere, investigating sainthood and transcendence, ability to creativity and creative thinking, and, moreover, usage of language and symbolic reasoning which gives a control over emotions. However, his psychologist approach collapses in absence of any of his determinants of a perfect human, what means that his philosophical system, including the psychologist logic, is case-dependent and applies to a selected group of humans by emergence on the basis of discrimination against intellectual features, often either inborn or independent on a personal choice.

He was interested in an ethical standpoint and the method of conflict solving known as nonviolence, what means an action without a violence. In relation to this of his research interests, he co-organized stays in Poland for a French pacifist Jean Goss and an Austrian Christian theologian and anti-war activist Hilderad Gross-Mayr, who in 2009 got the Pacem in Terris Peace and Freedom Award established by the Roman Catholic Diocese of Davenport in the U.S. state of Iowa to commemorate Pope John XXIII's the 1963 encyclical Pacem in terris (Peace on Earth) and in 1986 along with her husband got the Pope Paul VI Teacher of Peace Award by a Catholic peace organization Pax Christi USA. In particular, at the beginning of the Polish trade union federation Independent Self-governing Labour Union Solidarity, he organized the meeting of Jean Goss with the then movement leader Lech Wałęsa, who after being awarded by the 1983 Nobel Peace Prize to which the Goss couple were also nominated got also the 2001 Pacem in Terris Peace and Freedom Award to recognize his leadership non-violent attitude. The Goss couple became famous as the apostles of nonviolence, particularly for preparation of the 1986 People Power Revolution ('Yellow Revolution') in Philippines, and lobbying for recognition of the conscientious objection by the Roman Catholic Church during the 1962–1965 Second Vatican Council opened by Pope John XXIII and closed by Pope Paul VI. In 1991, just after the dissolution of the Soviet Union, Grzegorczyk was instrumental in organization of a symposium in Moscow dedicated to the nonviolence philosophy with participation of the Goss couple as well as a Canadian Catholic philosopher, theologian, and humanitarian Jean Vanier who was awarded by the 2013 Pacem in Terris Peace and Freedom Award and the 2015 Templeton Prize and an American political scientist and writer on strategy of a nonviolent struggle Gene Sharp who in 1983 was the founding father of the Albert Einstein Institution to explore the methods of nonviolent resistance in conflicts and in 2009–2015 was four times nominated to the Nobel Peace Prize. Despite of some kind of liberalism present in his thought, he was a definitely radical thinker, in particular, he propagated a nonviolent dialogue with everyone including terrorists, he was particularly fervent in forcing towards both logic and dialogue with everyone, and he claimed that going towards defense in any conditions of own dignity and inventory is harmful because the Christian Doctrine of turning the other cheek is correct. He applied his ethics to a conflict resolution, put a particular emphasis onto to the methods of nonviolence professed by Mahatma Gandhi and Martin Luther King Jr., the laureate of the 1965 Pacem in Terris Peace and Freedom Award, he was also one of the first public figures in Poland who focused attention on the ecological issues, and, before it was widely understood in Poland, he popularized the warnings due to the Club of Rome which have claimed that the resources of our planet are scarce and the idea of permanent growth is dangerous.

Morality and religious study 
In his philosophical marriage between religious involvement and both reism and a specific variant of naturalism, the particular position was occupied by the moral dimension of the religious study from the point of view of Christianity. In his pseudo-essays, pseudo-sermons, and pseudo-treatises collected in the book Moralitety awarded in 1987 by the prize Warszawska Premiera Literacka (Warsaw Literary Award), he emphasized the central elements of the Christian doctrine such like the radical command to give a selfless care testimony, especially with respect to an enemy. He attempted to place himself in the role of a Catholic priest who claims that a self-demolition is not important if personal intentions are not allowed to be reduced, whereas in the book Europa: odkrywanie sensu istnienia (Europe: discovering the sense of existence) he emphasized the role of a logical reasoning in the foundations of civilization achievements to give an axiological theory of history. He claimed therein that the evolutionary development of humankind is accompanied by a specific participation of divine forces into development of human cultures, especially he pointed out altruism and a voluntary service as the examples of such either biological theology or theological biology. Without taking into account directly the Roman Catholic Church's domination in Europe and its enormous impact onto the foundations of the European philosophy in the form of various intellectual restrictions, such like in the most known cases of the Italian scholar Galileo Gailei and philosopher Giordano Bruno, he claimed European scientific theories were always logically ordered and based on deduction, empiricism and phenomenology, and limited the sense of the world to nothing but seeing the world as similar to an understandable text – hence he claimed that the explored world is already a humanly ordered structure. For him, history of religion is just deepening of this sense, with Abraham placed as the initiator of a new epoch of monotheism and a biblical reasoning as a pictorial system, which both married with the ancient Greco-Roman intellectual traditionalism gives the most appropriate philosophical system.

On his theory, Jesus Christ of Nazareth appeals for a well-defined individual testimony, and the issues of a daily life are nothing when compared to the extreme situations because Christianity for him is a realization of spiritual rather than vital values. He saw the teachings of Jesus as the acceptance of the European logic, he radically saw Jesus Christ as the provider of the European moral pattern because Jesus demanded and demonstrated coherent individual testimony. According to Grzegorczyk, in a wide sense logic lays the foundations of the European rationalism, with respect to which he identified himself as a cultivator, which says that any knowledge must emerge by logic and empiricism and must go only towards the essential points. By his personal religious standpoint shared with the passion to logic, he always fought against himself and was limited to no more than two possibilities: the way of ethics and its universality and allowing the inexpressible in order to kill the conflict between a reason and religion. Thus, by his point of view, a rational theology is useless in favour of an imprecisely defined spiritual religiousness merely based on ecumenic approach to Christianity, that is for Grzegorczyk the biblical traditionalism of Catholicism losses the intellectual value when compared to the moral testimony of its creator Jesus Christ – a reason married with an openness towards values. What is more interesting for Grzegorczyk's religious creativity, although his formal membership at the Roman Catholic Church he frequently expressed critical opinions on concrete policies of this religious organization, even on the pages of free-thinkers periodicals, and, similarly to a Russian religious philosopher Vladimir Slovyov, he manifestly ignored the East–West Schism between the Roman Catholicism and Orthodox Christianity, for example he took the Eucharist sacrament at both the Orthodox Church and the Roman Catholic Church. He was a fervent follower of Roman Catholics who felt an affinity to the Russian Orthodoxy, his religious reflection merged Christian morality to the European cultural tradition and by his views the same values lay the foundations of both Christianity and European rationalism. In his approach, history of Christianity, including its biblical roots, can be considered the history of how a sense and understanding of the world can be deepened by contemplating the sacred and transcendent.

He convinced that Modernity with its technological development creates the new challenges for humans, whose realization demands both an appropriate ethical mode, such like dedication to other and conscious self-limitations, and the rationalist standpoint. What is intriguing, in practice he realized this of his ideas for a general public in the form of a monk-like modest appearance joined with straightforward and often manifestly ignorant and arrogant if no blatant speech, which by virtue of the dogmatic Christianity could be interpreted in terms of either demonic possession or act of blasphemy. For example, in his article Odpowiedzialność filozofów (Responsibility of philosophers) he claimed that a philosopher whose texts are at the service of state authorities, creates a vicious circle of unquestionable truths which have not much in common with reality and strengthen the authorities's monopoly on a political violence, similarly to the Roman Catholic Church's theorists who referred to the holy books instead of commenting on the facts, whereas this article was published in May 1981 on the pages of the Polish Catholic quarterly Więź with death of the Primate of Poland Cardinal Stefan Wyszyński as the main subject of the issue and on the eve of introduction of the martial law in Poland by the communist authorities to crush the political opposition. It was not the only one and episodic case when Grzegorczyk could not clearly and unambiguously decide on his intellectual position with respect to the teachings of the Roman Catholic Church and the political ideology of the communist state authorities. He openly presented himself in a straightforward opposition to a religious organization when it was convenient and useful to his professional activities and when it gave him a professional advance or other at least societal profit, whereas he became suddenly manifestly religious when he sought any gains to support his ideology by a religion. In particular, the latter feature was ostentatiously expressed by his idea of ecumenism between the Roman Catholic Church and the Russian Orthodox Church, especially when he sought the profits in the academic contacts with Russian and Ukrainian academic professionals who humbly supported promotion of his borderline philosophical ideas motivated by himself arranged hospitability and grants.

The big gap in conformity with respect to both political and social association which he adopted from the Roman Catholic-oriented teachers of his war-time underground education supported by his father's attitude was completely filled with a big conformity towards his academic career based on the politicized part of the Polish academia independently on a political system of Poland, what he made with extraordinary intellectual autonomy and a coherent reasoning. Following his personal pseudo-clerical image and pseudo-homiletic written style formed on the dogmatic philosophical traditionalism appropriate to both the Fathers and Doctors of the Roman Catholic Church enriched by the arguments of neo-Thomism and Christian existentialism, he attempted to defend a manifestly old-fashioned model of academic work understood as a humble dedication to ideas and humanity rather than a professionalism. In particular, in his part of the 2005's survey Gdzie ta nasza filozofia? (Where is this Our Philosophy?) he sought new circumstances of philosophizing as generated by the current fashions and the collective factors such like massiveness of higher education and general commercialization of life, he compared the present-day both philosophers and generally all humanists to businessmen who first of all look for their personal professional success by the way of a relatively fast and an appropriately high return of the incurred hardships rather than a long and arduous effort which leads to a perfect product, and, moreover, he claimed that the sham achievements are fully able to give quite good living conditions to scientists and philosophers because social control over these products is already impossible as a result of development of an academic specialization beyond such control.

Social issues 
For Grzegorczyk, the greatest intellectual challenge was an axiological approach to human history. Taking from the Marxist sociology, he approached cultural conflict by wealth of a privileged social class as contrasted to poverty of the rest of a society marginalized and excluded from a system focusing on rich, powerful, and clever individuals. He enriched the Marxian thought by emphasis onto the role of intellectual divisions in perpetuation of conflicts, and, similarly to the creators of the Aryan race theory based on the common proto-language, contributed the Utopian necessity of a common language for agreement and reconciliation in the global scale, as well as the Utopian idea of an identical insight of all people in understanding the wholeness of human affairs. Furthermore, he attempted to convince that the suitable theoretical apparatus is the only way for the worldly peace, that since needs of everyone can not be satisfied there is the necessity to endure limitations collectively and introduce global regulations on the basis of a persuasive argument, and that a synthesis of scientific knowledge is necessary to serve the fair and peaceful coexistence, a theory solidified in 1956 by a Soviet leader Nikita Khrushchev in the Marxist-Leninist-inspired Soviet foreign policy at the 20th Congress of the CPSU and applied by the Soviet Union and the Soviet-allied socialist states such like the communist Poland during the 1947–1991 Cold War, especially in the phases Cold War (1953–1962) and Cold War (1962–1979). Grzegorczyk doctrinally did not respect any form of pluralism and any kind of diversity among humankind, he sought the order in a large scale uniformity which is appropriate to the political ideologies which laid the foundations of the 20th century totalitarianism in Europe – both German Nazism and Soviet communism. For this reason, implicitly, he sought the European totalitarianism as the consequence of the European cultural heritage supported by his logic. On the basis of the Universal Declaration of Human Rights, he appealed to the United Nations to take into account the principle that every person has the right to help any other person in a worse position than himself or herself in whatever country that person may reside, what in 1977 met the applause due to an American-Jewish leftist philosopher and left-wing activist Noam Chomsky who published a fragment of his correspondence with Grzegorczyk.

In the aftermath of the famous 1972's report The Limits to Growth by the Club of Rome, he developed his general Utopian idea of all-human solidarity by propagation of self-limitations on consumption and combating wastefulness. In contrary to his 'general well-being' utopia, in the case of political ethics he mostly contributed to criticism of the Solidarity, the Eastern bloc's first independent trade union recognized by a communist regime and created in September 1980 at the Vladimir Lenin Shipyard in Gdańsk under the leadership of Lech Wałęsa, in the time when the communist Poland was strongly divided between its supporters and opponents, and when there was not a place for the "middle option" between the yes and the no for the anti-communist opposition. Despite that Grzegorczyk at this time was not an open supporter to the Polish government, it was understood as his direct conformity with the communist authorities in the name of his false concept of peace, and, consequently, the society of the Catholic intellectuals related to the magazine Tygodnik Powszechny (The Catholic Weekly) broke collaboration with him. Moreover, although he survived the 1939–1945 Nazi–Soviet occupation of Poland and was injured as an insurgent of the 1944 Warsaw Uprising, he manifestly demonstrated a glaring absence of sensitivity on the problem of the Holocaust, and also in this case his attitude entirely confirmed the crucial impact due to the war-time underground teachers of strictly nationalist-Catholic orientation. In 1993, he authored an article Dekalog rozumu (Ten commandments of reason) which proposed the moral rules 1. You will not clap, 2. You will not whistle, 3. Listen to the content, not the tone of expression, 4. Fight with an argument, not with a human, 5. Do not flatter other and yourself, 6. Distrust other and yourself, 7. Search for what is important, 8. Try to build something better, instead to look for scapegoats, 9. Do not generalize too hastily, 10. Do not use proverbs, they are usually a stupidity of nations, which imitated and caricatured the Ten Commandments by an Old-Testament Jewish leader Moses to ridicule the biblical foundations of Judeo-Christianity by comparing them to the academic work.

Education 
Grzegorczyk had a paradoxically formed mindset, a mind which was as modal as a modal logic. By the variety of his views, he criticized and was criticized by more radical exponents of various ideological positions – Catholics disliked his contacts with Atheists, Atheists accused him of clericalism, anti-communists disliked his attempts for searching the middle position, communists questioned his defense of freedom. He wanted to marry all with everyone, but his idea of unification was able to create only a borderline philosophical system whose followers create a dramatic minority even in the academic philosophy of Poland. The unpopularity of his system is contained in the open discrimination inherited with idealism, especially the German idealism such like of Friedrich Nietzsche which served as the philosophical basis for the Nazi Germany political ideology by Adolf Hitler. His logically trivialized philosophical views were inadequate for both communists and anti-communists, for both religious and irreligious individuals, for both philosophers and scientists, because he manifestly avoided a strict association with any concrete group and, in fact, participated in a one-person struggle for independence and freedom.

Despite that he was a well functioned academic personality among few major specialized groups – mathematicians, philosophers, Catholic intellectuals, people of art – and was active in the international society of socio-political activists, he solicitously worked on the public self-picture which presented him as independent on political, social, religious, and scientific relationships to get some popularity among students in the times when the Polish academia was directly dependent on the communist ideology and governed by the politicized scholars. Nevertheless, in his daily work, he tended to the goals which created the appraisal of an inexhaustible way towards extraordinary egoism and self-comfort with a help of conformity with any of the aforementioned systems, he simply used his social links and professional connections within these systems when it was necessary to him. For example, he manifestly declared in public to audiences and students that he had never tended to get any higher positions in academia, whereas actually he easily accepted all higher positions offered to him and abandoned a work only when he sought is as inconvenient with respect to his purposes, such like the cultural and political ones met in Amsterdam which were in a direct conflict with his religious and ideological views adequate to the reduced both intellectual and social expression in the communist Poland.

He had never attempted to be a favourite academic teacher, he openly avoided any close cooperations with his students and deflected their attention by lack of will to co-authorship with a parallel will to interact with them for knowing more about them, he preferred a bold individual research work although he had multiple collaborations. He was hungry for knowledge on world and people, such like in the "ecumenic dialogue" with the Soviets and the various Polish communists, but was never able to fully follow any concrete system, had never joined any political party, and was focused merely on collecting information only for construction of a possible either critique or irony. Even those very few students who decided to prepare their doctoral dissertations under his supervising, never felt to contribute in the work of their mentor and to continue his intellectual traditionalism, because emergence of an academic school dedicated to development of his heritage in mathematics, logic, ethics, philosophy was impossible by his attitude. He was able to attract the attention of students extremely rarely, the facts say for themselves in the best way – over more than six decades of his academic work, he was able to produce no more than three doctoral students with 10–20 years of difference between the graduations, he supervised a computer scientist Stanisław Waligórski's thesis in mathematics Equations in closure algebras and their applications (1964), a Polish-Jewish philosopher and mathematician Stanisław Krajewski's thesis in logic Nonstandard classes of satisfiability and their applications in investigating of some extensions of axiomatic theories (1975), and an aesthetician Bohdan Misiuna's thesis in ethics Philosophical analysis of disgust phenomena and its axiological consequences (1992).

Since the time of his underground higher education, both he had supported and he was supported primarily by the politically involved academic teachers such like Bogdan Suchodolski and also Jan Łukasiewicz. When Suchodolski organized interdisciplinary meetings for professors in the Palace of Congresses and Conferences of the PAS in Jabłonna near Warsaw in presence of a meticulously chosen audience, in particular the students who had the preferred "social origin", then he served humbly as the pillar. In the time of the dominant socialist orthodoxy, he presented himself as the "Jesus Christ" of the Polish humanities – for students his philosophy was beyond the bias, intellectual enslavement and hardline correctness of the state ideology. For the communist Poland's state authorities he was officially a persona non grata secured by the politically useful historical family background, whereas for the academic youth he served as the 'socrealist Messiah' against the system teachings. He was a talented speaker towards the youth, in both philosophizing and personal action he avoided biased and emotional notions, particularism, cultivation of a scheme, routine, institution in favour of an individual, and impressive words. He impacted onto an authentic individual attitude by his analytical, synthetic and globalist reasoning, criticism on own activities, selflessness in cognitive actions, promotion of a selective truth, constant attention and control over research by the selective values based on the specific union of the Christian theology and liberalized Marxist thought.

On the one hand, his style of giving opinions was particularly distinctive in both criticism and straightforwardness, often manifestly explicit and giving the impression of directly either conflicting with or fighting against the ideals which he supported theoretically, but, on the other hand, he expressed opinions only when it was fully convenient and safe for his professional and intellectual position and preserved his personal world view. His logically radicalized philosophical system was the specific mixture of the Christian theology and the Communist Ideology which directed his primary logical thought onto the intellectual margins to walk on the borderlines with a liberation theology and a religious communism, and to visit these extremist and anarchistic territories time by time for an intellectual explosion. In a clear opposition to pluralism of the world, he manifestly claimed existence of the selective values which are absolute and universal in the earthly scale. His theoretical pedagogy, more precisely philosophy of education, was based on the specific ideological mode of nonviolence philosophy, which was particularly attractive in the period of development of anti-communist opposition and political repressions in the communist Poland. He left an explicit context of the Communist Ideology in favour of his own ideology on both similarity of life and creativity, and action and rationalism which by an ecumenic approach married the Christian theology with selected concepts of Marxism with the background in logic. However, his philosophy was able to inspire educational theory and practice in Poland by freedom, tolerance, independent choice, individual rights, and the dictate of the related professional duties of an educator. On the other hand, also his ideology of democracy was attractive for some young intellectuals of the communist Poland, because it employed the concepts of a civil society and discussion community formed by a scattering between totalitarianism and anti-totalitarianism.

Family 
In 1953, he married Renata Maria Grzegorczykowa née Majewska who is an internationally renowned Polish philologist and expert in polonist linguistics, since 2001 a professor emeritus at the Section of Grammar, Semantics and Pragmatics of the Institute of Polish language of the Faculty of Polish Studies of the University of Warsaw. In 1964 she got a doctoral degree for a thesis in Polish verbs, in 1974 she completed habilitation with a book in semantic and syntactic functions of Polish adverbs, in 1976–1979 she was a deputy-director and in 1981–1984 was the director of the Institute of Polish Language, she was appointed an associate professor in 1983 and a Full Professor in 1995, and, in 1982–2001, she was the head of the Section of Grammatical Structure of Modern Polish Language. Grzegorczykowa is a full member of the Warsaw Scientific Society, in 2007–2011 she was a member the Phraseology Commission and the Commission of Language Theory, and to which in 2015–2018 has been a collaborator along with the Ethnolinguistic Commission, of the Committee of Linguistics of the PAS. In 1997–1999, she was the head of an international project in comparative lexical semantics at the University of Warsaw in collaboration with specialists from the universities of Prague, Moscow, Kiev, and Stockholm. She contributed to word formation, syntax, and semantics of Polish language, her interests were also related to slavistics, neopragmatism, and philosophy, in her investigations she made use of the methods of structural linguistics, cognitive linguistics and generative grammar. In particular, she investigated the semantic-syntactic interpretation of language and text based on the analysis of predicate-argument structures, the logical structure of Polish sentences such like reference and modality, semantic-pragmatic relationships studied in the context of the theory of speech acts and functions of language and text, linguistic foundations of cognitive science and its role for language mechanisms. By many years until retirement she was a member of the Commission of Grammatical Structure of Slavic languages of the International Committee of Slavists.

Her father, Polish mining engineer and industrialist Leszek Majewski, in 1920–1948 was the director of the Pruszków factory of pencils Majewski St. i S-ka, created by his father a Polish engineer, industrialist, and writer Stanisław Jan Majewski who was a member of the Legislative Sejm (1919–1922) and the 1st Parliament (1922–1927) of the Second Polish Republic as a representative of the Popular National Union, and on 2 May 1924 was awarded the Commander's Cross of the Order of Polonia Restituta by President Stanisław Wojciechowski. Stanisław's brother a Polish scientist and novelist Erazm Majewski created the foundations of the Polish academic archeology and in 1919 was appointed the head of the Chair of Prehistoric Archeology of the University of Warsaw. Similarly to Grzegorczyk, during the World War II her older brother Second Lieutenant and Sub-Scoutmaster Jacek Majewski was an insurgent of the Warsaw uprising pseudonymed Sielakowa in the rank of acting Commander of Platoon, since 1942 he served in the Assault Groups of the Gray Ranks which was the underground paramilitary of the Polish Scouting Association, in 1944 he commanded the 1st Platoon Sad of the 2nd Company Rudy of the AK Battalion 'Zośka' of the Diversionary Brigade Broda 53 of the 'Radosław' Group of the Home Army, and was killed on 31 August 1944 at the Bielańska street in Warsaw during the unsuccessful attempt of transfer of the Group Północ soldiers, including young Grzegorczyk, by the city canals from the Warsaw Old Town to the Warsaw Śródmieście, and he was awarded by the Cross of Valour. Since her mother Maria née Borsuk was the only daughter of a Polish physician-surgeon Marian Stanisław Borsuk, an active member of the Warsaw Medical Society who in 1907–1923 was the head of the Surgical Department of the former Wolski Hospital in Warsaw and whose origins were in the Wilno Voivodeship of the Second Polish Republic which is a part of the modern-day Lithuania, the family members include also her younger brother a famous Polish mathematician Karol Borsuk of the University of Warsaw and his only daughter a Polish paleontologist and phylogeneticist Maria Magdalena Borsuk-Białynicka who is a Full Professor at the Roman Kozłowski Institute of Paleobiology of the PAS. Grzegorczyk's other kins are also her husband a Polish algebraic geometer Andrzej Szczepan Białynicki-Birula who pioneered in differential algebra and is both a full member of the PAS and a Full Professor at the University of Warsaw, his older brother a Polish theoretical physicist Iwo Białynicki-Birula who is a full member of the PAS with the positions of a Full Professor at the Center for Theoretical Physics of the PAS and a professor emeritus at the University of Warsaw, and his wife a Polish theoretical physicist Zofia Białynicka-Birula née Wiatr who is a Full Professor at the Institute of Physics of the PAS.

Grzegorczyk had a daughter and a son. His son Tomasz Grzegorczyk, who was born in 1954 and in 2003 authored the French-Polish translation of a classical academic book in pedagogical ethics Le choix d'éduquer: éthique et pédagogie (1991) by a French theorist of education Philippe Meirieu, studied psychology at the University of Warsaw and at this time was an oppositionist student activist and under the pseudonym Grzegorz Tomczyk collaborated with the Workers' Defense Committee (KOR), a major dissident and civil organization which was founded in June–September 1976 by dominantly Jacek Kuroń as a result of Piotr Jaroszewicz's government crackdown on strikes and imprisonment of striking workers under the 1970–1980 First Secretary of the KC PZPR Edward Gierek when the communist Poland had come into a multi-aspect economic crisis, was intellectually inspired by Kołakowski's 1971 essay Tezy o nadziei i beznadziejności (Theses on hope and hopelessness) published in the No. 6 of the Kultura paryska (Paris Culture) who himself in 1977–1980 officially represented the KOR in the United Kingdom and was responsible for its contacts with the Polish emigration of 1968 to give the idea of creation of the Free Trade Unions of the Coast (WZZW) in April 1978 which by the Gdańsk Agreement in August 1980 generated the Independent Self-governing Labour Union Solidarity which finished the Gierek Decade. Grzegorczyk's son-in-law a Roman Catholic journalist and activist Marcin Przeciszewski is a historian of the Roman Catholic Church graduated at the University of Warsaw who also studied at the Institute of Historical geography of the KUL, and who since 1993 has been the editor-in-chief and the president of the Catholic Information Agency (KAI), is a consular to the Polish Episcopal Conference's Council for Mass Media and the president to the Polish Episcopal Conference's Foundation for Exchange of Religious Information, since 2003 has been a co-organizer of the cross-cultural Gniezno congresses, former member of the program board of the state-funded and government-controlled Polish Television (TVP S.A.). His father a Polish economist and nationalist activist Tadeusz Przeciszewski was an insurgent of the Warsaw Uprising under the pseudonym Michał, he served at the Home Army in the rank of Corporal Officer Cadet, in 1939 was mobilized as a soldier to the World War II and served in Wołyń, in 1940 joined the National Party and co-organized the Interwar period's nationalist Youth of Grand Poland, few months of 1945 was imprisoned in the Soviet NKVD forced labour camp Kashai in the Sverdlovsk Oblast, in 1945 got a magister degree at the Faculty of Law of the KUL, in 1946 graduated at the Warsaw School of Economics and was appointed an assistant at the Department of Political Economics of the Faculty of Law of the University of Warsaw where in 1948 got a doctoral degree for a thesis on J.M. Keynes' economics, in November 1948 – December 1953 was imprisoned for creation of a massive Catholic-nationalist movement after the common trial with his future wife Hanna Iłowiecka-Przeciszewska and Wiesław Chrzanowski who in 1991–1993 was the Marshal of the Sejm of the post-communist Poland, in 1954 co-created the Catholic quarterly Więź (The Tie) along with Tadeusz Mazowiecki who in 1989–1991 was the first Prime Minister and a Catholic activist Janusz Zabłocki who was a member of the PAX Association in 1950–1955 and the Club of Catholic Intelligentsia in 1957–1976, in 1957 was appointed an assistant professor at the Faculty of Political Economics of the University of Warsaw and in 1963 completed habilitation procedure therein, in 1964 for declining to join the communist party was forced to delegation to the Faculty of Economics of the Maria Curie-Skłodowska University (MCSU) in Lublin as a docent and lectured at the KUL, in 1965–1992 was the founder and head of the Section of Planning and Economic Politics at MCSU, in 1966–1967 stayed at the University of Paris and in 1975 at the Johns Hopkins University in Baltimore, in 1971 was elected the chairman of the Section of Cultural Economics at the Warsaw branch of the Polish Economic Society, in 1973–1979 was a member of the Committee of Work and Social Politics of the PAS, in 1981–1996 was a member of the Committee of Economic Sciences of the PAS, in 1972 was appointed an associate professor and in 1982 was appointed a Full Professor, in 1971–1989 was a member of a centrist political party Alliance of Democrats where attempted to create a Christian-social fraction, in 1990 was elected the chairman of the reactivated Christian Democratic Labour Party, was awarded by the Knight's Cross and the Officer's Cross of the Order of Polonia Restituta as well the Home Army Cross. His wife Hanna Iłowiecka-Przeciszewska was a Catholic and social activist who studied pedagogy at the University of the Western Lands, in 1948–1952 was imprisoned by the communist authorities, since 1956 was a member of the Warsaw branch of the Club of Catholic Intelligentsia and its many-year president, and was awarded by the Gold Cross of Merit.

One of Grzegorczyk's publicly known grandchildren are a Polish physician-internist Franciszek Grzegorczyk who has worked for a few hospitals in Warsaw, including the academic Institute of Tuberculosis and Lung Diseases which was earlier the former Wolski Hospital, an economist Jacek Przeciszewski who graduated at the Warsaw School of Economics and is an activist of the Warsaw branch of the Club of Catholic Intelligentsia, and a lawyer Jan Przeciszewski.

Grzegorczyk died of natural causes in Warsaw on 20 March 2014 at the age of 91. His body is buried in the Cemetery of Pruszków.

Famous quotes 
"The achievements of Alfred Tarski were the most brilliant result of a favorable cultural entanglement which took place in Poland in the first half of the twentieth century." - from the book Alfred Tarski: Life and Logic (2008) by Anita Burdman Feferman and Solomon Feferman

Selected publications

Books 
Grzegorczyk, Andrzej (2003): Psychiczna osobliwość człowieka. Wydawnictwo Naukowe Scholar, Warszawa
Grzegorczyk, Andrzej (2001): Europa: Odkrywanie sensu istnienia. Studium Generale Europa: Instytut Politologii Uniwersytet Kardynała Stefana Wyszyńskiego, Warszawa
Grzegorczyk, Andrzej (1997): Logic – a Human Affair. Wydawnictwo Naukowe Scholar, Warszawa 
Grzegorczyk, Andrzej (1993): Życie jako wyzwanie: Wprowadzenie w filozofię racjonalistyczną. Wydawnictwo Instytutu Filozofii i Socjologii Polskiej Akademii Nauk, Warszawa
in Ukrainian: Життя як виклик: Вступ до раціоналістичної філософії. Wydawnictwo Naukowe Scholar, Warszawa & ВНТЛ, Львів, 1997 
in Russian: Жизнь как вызов: Введение в рационалистическую философию. «Вузовская книга», Москва, 2006 
Grzegorczyk, Andrzej (1989): Mała propedeutyka filozofii naukowej. Instytut Wydawniczy "Pax", Warszawa 
Grzegorczyk, Andrzej (1989): Etyka w doświadczeniu wewnętrznym. Instytut Wydawniczy "Pax", Warszawa 
Grzegorczyk, Andrzej (1986): Moralitety. Instytut Wydawniczy "Pax", Warszawa 
Grzegorczyk, Andrzej (1983): Próba treściowego opisu świata wartości i jej etyczne konsekwencje. Zakład Narodowy imienia Ossolińskich: Wydawnictwo Polskiej Akademii Nauk, Wrocław 
Grzegorczyk, Andrzej (1979): Filozofia czasu próby. Éditions du Dialogue, Paris (2nd edition 1984, Instytut Wydawniczy "Pax", Warszawa) 
Grzegorczyk, Andrzej (1971): Zarys arytmetyki teoretycznej. Państwowe Wydawnictwo Naukowe, Warszawa 
Grzegorczyk, Andrzej (1969): An Outline of Mathematical Logic: Fundamental Results and Notions Explained with All Details. D. Reidel, Boston 
Grzegorczyk, Andrzej (1967): Basic notes in foundations. Instytut Matematyki PAN, Warszawa 
Grzegorczyk, Andrzej (1963): Schematy i człowiek: Szkice filozoficzne. Wydawnictwo Znak, Kraków 
Grzegorczyk, Andrzej (1961, 1973, 1975, 1981, 1984): Zarys logiki matematycznej. Państwowe Wydawnictwo Naukowe, Warszawa 
Grzegorczyk, Andrzej (1961): Fonctions Récursives. Gauthier-Villars, Paris 
Grzegorczyk, Andrzej (1957): Zagadnienia rozstrzygalności. Państwowe Wydawnictwo Naukowe, Warszawa 
Grzegorczyk, Andrzej (1955, 1958, 1961, 2010): Logika popularna: Przystępny zarys logiki zdań. Państwowe Wydawnictwo Naukowe, Warszawa
in Czech: Populární logika. Státní Nakladatelství Politické Literatury, Praha, 1957 
in Russian: Популярная логика: Общедоступный очерк логики предложений, «Наука", Москва, 1965

Journal articles 
Grzegorczyk, Andrzej (2013): Wizja wartości i dramat wyboru wartości w myśli europejskiej. Wspólnotowość i Postawa Uniwersalistyczna: Rocznik PTU 2012–2013, Number 8, pp. 5–20
Grzegorczyk, Andrzej (2012): Światopoglądowa integracja ludzkiej wiedzy. Przegląd Filozoficzny – Nowa Seria, Volume 21, Issue 2, pp. 29–48
Grzegorczyk, Andrzej (2011): Filozofia logiki I formalna logika niesymplifikacyjna. Zagadnienia Naukoznawstwa, Volume 47, Issue 190, pp. 445–451 (Errata: Zagadnienia Naukoznawstwa, Volume 48, Issue 194, p. 318)
Grzegorczyk, Andrzej (2010): Uczciwość w nauce. Próba podsumowania (The moral integrity of the scientific research). Kwartalnik NAUKA, Number 3, pp. 194–200 
Przełęcki, Marian; Grzegorczyk, Andrzej; Jadacki, Jacek Juliusz; Brożek, Anna; Baranowska, Małgorzata Maria; Stróżewski, Władysław Antoni (2009): Inspired by the Bible (Z inspiracji biblijnej). Kwartalnik Filozoficzny, Volume 37, Issue 2, pp. 137–160
Grzegorczyk, Andrzej (2008): Prawdziwość cecha ważna, łatwa do określenia, trudniejsza do osiągnięcia (Felieton filozoficzny). Przegląd Humanistyczny, Volume 52, Number 2, Issue 407, pp. 71–81
Stępień, Antoni Bazyli; Krajewski, Radosław; Grzegorczyk, Andrzej (2005): Gdzie ta nasza filozofia? – Dyskusji ciąg dalszy. Miesięcznik Znak, Issue 602–603, pp. 107–114
Heller, Michał Kazimierz; Chwedeńczuk, Bohdan; Szahaj, Andrzej Jarosław; Przełęcki, Marian; Buczyńska-Garewicz, Hanna; Sady, Wojciech Henryk; Bołtuć, Piotr; Piłat, Robert; Grzegorczyk, Andrzej; Koj, Leon Józef; Porębski, Czesław; Ziemiński, Ireneusz; Marciszewski, Witold (2005): Gdzie ta nasza filozofia? – ankieta. Miesięcznik Znak, Issue 600, pp. 29–54
Grzegorczyk, Andrzej (2005): Undecidability without Arithmetization. Studia Logica: An International Journal for Symbolic Logic, Volume 79, Issue 2, pp. 163–230
Grzegorczyk, Andrzej (2004): A Philosophy for That Time: The Philosophy of Selflessness. Dialogue and Universalism, Volume 14, Issue 5–6, pp. 167–171
Grzegorczyk, Andrzej (2004): Decidability without Mathematics. Annals of Pure and Applied Logic, Volume 126, Issue 1–3, pp. 309–312
Grzegorczyk, Andrzej (2003): Czasy i wyzwania. Wspólnotowość i Postawa Uniwersalistyczna: Rocznik PTU 2002–2003, Number 3, pp. 5–20
Grzegorczyk, Andrzej (2002): Europe: discovering the meaning of existence. Dialogue and Universalism, Issue 6–7, pp. 111–126
Grzegorczyk, Andrzej (2000): Racjonalizm europejski jako sposób myślenia. Wspólnotowość i Postawa Uniwersalistyczna: Rocznik PTU 2000–2001, Number 2, pp. 5–8
Grzegorczyk, Andrzej (1999): Antropologiczne podstawy edukacji globalnej. Forum oświatowe, Number 1–2, Issue 20–21, pp. 5–13
Grzegorczyk, Andrzej (1999): The vocation of Europe. Dialogue and Universalism, Issue 5–6, pp. 11–41
Grzegorczyk, Andrzej; Morokhoyeva, Zoya Petrovna; Zapaśnik, Stanisław (1998): Universalistic Social Education. Dialogue and Universalism, Volume 8, Number 5–6, pp. 159–163
Grzegorczyk, Andrzej (1993): Dekalog rozumu. Wiedza i Życie, Volume 3, pp. 18–20
Grzegorczyk, Andrzej (1989): Działania pokojowe a postawy etyczne. Studia Philosophiae Christianae, Issue 1, pp. 141–159 
Grzegorczyk, Andrzej (1987): Wierność i świadectwo. Studia Filozoficzne, Issue 5, pp. 33–39 
Grzegorczyk, Andrzej (1983): Pojęcie godności jako element poznawczej regulacji ludzkiego zachowania. Studia Filozoficzne, Issue 8–9, pp. 57–76 
Grzegorczyk, Andrzej (1981): Odpowiedzialność filozofów. Więź, Volume 23, Issue 5, pp. 49–56 
Grzegorczyk, Andrzej (1981): My Version of the Christian Vision of Sense. Dialectics and Humanism: The Polish Philosophical Quarterly, Volume 8, Issue 3, pp. 51–53 
Grzegorczyk, Andrzej (1977): On Certain Formal Consequences of Reism. Dialectics and Humanism: The Polish Philosophical Quarterly, Volume 1, pp. 75–80 
Grzegorczyk, Andrzej (1974): Przeżycie transcendencji a mity kultury. Znak, Issue 236, pp. 224–235 
Grzegorczyk, Andrzej (1971–1972): An unfinitizability proof by means of restricted reduced power. Fundamenta Mathematicae, Volume 73, pp. 37–49 
Grzegorczyk, Andrzej (1971): Klasyczne, relatywistyczne i konstruktywistyczne sposoby uznawania twierdzeń matematycznych. Studia Logica: An International Journal for Symbolic Logic, Volume 27, Issue 1, pp. 151–161 
Bulletin de l'Académie Polonaise des Sciences: Série des sciences mathématiques, astronomiques, et physiques, Volume 16, Issue 9, pp. 687–692 
Grzegorczyk, Andrzej (1968): Assertions depending on time and corresponding logical calculi. Compositio Mathematica, Volume 20, pp. 83–87
Grzegorczyk, Andrzej (1967): Non-classical propositional calculi in relation to methodological patterns of scientific investigation. Studia Logica: An International Journal for Symbolic Logic, Volume 20, Issue 1, pp. 117–132
Grzegorczyk, Andrzej (1967): Some relational systems and the associated topological spaces. Fundamenta Mathematicae, Volume 60, pp. 223–231
Grzegorczyk, Andrzej (1965): Nasi bracia mariawici. Więź, Volume 12, Issue 92, pp. 40–45
Grzegorczyk, Andrzej (1964): Recursive objects in all finite types. Fundamenta Mathematicae, Volume 54, pp. 73–93
Grzegorczyk, Andrzej (1964): A note on the theory of propositional types. Fundamenta Mathematicae, Volume 54, pp. 27–29
Grzegorczyk, Andrzej (1964): A philosophically plausible formal interpretation of intuitionistic logic. Indagationes Mathematicae, Volume 26, pp. 596–601
Grzegorczyk, Andrzej (1964): Sprawdzalność empiryczna a matematyczna. In Kotarbiński, Tadeusz; Dąmbska, Izydora (editors) (1964): Rozprawy logiczne: Księga pamiątkowa ku czci Kazimierza Ajdukiewicza. Państwowe Wydawnictwo Naukowe, Warszawa, pp. 73–76. Republished as translation Mathematical and Empirical Verifiability in Przełęcki, Marian; Wójcicki, Ryszard (editors) (1977): Twenty-Five Years of Logical Methodology in Poland. D. Reidel, Boston & PWN–Polish Scientific Publishers, Warszawa, pp. 165–169
Grzegorczyk, Andrzej (1963): Zastosowanie logicznej metody wyodrębniania formalnej dziedziny rozważań w nauce, technice i gospodarce. Studia Filozoficzne, Issue 3–4, pp. 63–75
Mazur, Stanisław; edited by Grzegorczyk, Andrzej and Rasiowa, Helena (1963): Computable analysis. Rozprawy Matematyczne, Volume 33
Grzegorczyk, Andrzej (1962): Uzasadnianie aksjomatów teorii matematycznych. Studia Logica: An International Journal for Symbolic Logic, Volume 13, Issue 1, pp. 197–202
Grzegorczyk, Andrzej (1962): On the concept of categoricity. Studia Logica: An International Journal for Symbolic Logic, Volume 13, Issue 1, pp. 39–66
Grzegorczyk, Andrzej (1962): A kind of categoricity. Colloquium Mathematicae, Volume 9, pp. 183–187
Grzegorczyk, Andrzej (1962): A theory without recursive models. Bulletin de l'Académie Polonaise des Sciences: Série des sciences mathématiques, astronomiques, et physiques, Volume 10, pp. 63–69
Grzegorczyk, Andrzej (1962): An example of two weak essentially undecidable theories F and F*. Bulletin de l'Académie Polonaise des Sciences: Série des sciences mathématiques, astronomiques, et physiques, Volume 10, pp. 5–9
Grzegorczyk, Andrzej (1961): Le traitement axiomatique de la notion de prolongement temporel. Studia Logica: An International Journal for Symbolic Logic, Volume 11, Issue 1, pp. 31–34
Grzegorczyk, Andrzej (1961): Aksjomatyczne badanie pojęcia przedłużenia czasowego. Studia Logica: An International Journal for Symbolic Logic, Volume 11, Issue 1, pp. 23–30
Grzegorczyk, Andrzej; Mostowski, Andrzej; Ryll-Nardzewski, Czesław (1961): Definability of sets in models of axiomatic theorems. Bulletin de l'Académie polonaise des sciences. Série des sciences mathématiques, astronomiques, et physiques, Volume 9, pp. 163–167
Grzegorczyk, Andrzej (1961): Metafizyka rzeczy żywych. Znak, Issue 80, pp. 154–162
Grzegorczyk, Andrzej (1960): Metafizyka bez spekulacji. Znak, Issue 77, pp. 1417–1421
Grzegorczyk, Andrzej (1960): O nie najlepszym rodzaju apologetyki. Znak, Issue 76, pp. 1343–1344
Grzegorczyk, Andrzej (1960): Axiomatizability of Geometry without Points. Synthese, Volume 12, pp. 228–235
Grzegorczyk, Andrzej (1959): Analiza filozoficzna, kontemplacja, wartościowanie. Studia Filozoficzne, Volume 5, Issue 14, pp. 161–173
Grzegorczyk, Andrzej (1958): Między dyskursywnym a kontemplacyjnym myśleniem. Znak, Issue 43, pp. 36–57
Grzegorczyk, Andrzej; Mostowski, Andrzej; Ryll-Nardzewski, Czesław (1958): The classical and the ω-complete arithmetic. Journal of Symbolic Logic, Volume 23, pp. 188–206
Grzegorczyk, Andrzej (1957): Uwagi z historii logiki. Myśl Filozoficzna, Volume 1, Issue 27, pp. 164–176
Grzegorczyk, Andrzej (1957): On the definitions of computable real continuous functions. Fundamenta Mathematicae, Volume 44, pp. 61–71 
Grzegorczyk, Andrzej (1956): Some proofs of undecidability of arithmetic. Fundamenta Mathematicae, Volume 43, pp. 166–177
Mostowski, Andrzej; Grzegorczyk, Andrzej; Jaśkowski, Stanisław; Łoś, Jerzy; Mazur, Stanisław; Rasiowa, Helena; Sikorski, Roman (1955): The present state of investigations on the foundations of mathematics. Rozprawy Matematyczne, Volume 9
Grzegorczyk, Andrzej (1955): Uwagi o rozumieniu praw logiki. Myśl Filozoficzna, Volume 1, Issue 15, pp. 206–221
Grzegorczyk, Andrzej (1955): Uwagi o nauczaniu logiki. Myśl Filozoficzna, Volume 1, Issue 4, pp. 174–177
Grzegorczyk, Andrzej (1955): On the definition of computable functionals. Fundamenta Mathematicae, Volume 42, pp. 232–239 
Grzegorczyk, Andrzej (1955): Computable functionals. Fundamenta Mathematicae, Volume 42, pp. 168–202
Grzegorczyk, Andrzej (1955): Elementarily definable analysis. Fundamenta Mathematicae, Volume 41, pp. 311–338 
Grzegorczyk, Andrzej (1955): The Systems of Leśniewski in Relation to Contemporary Logical Research. Studia Logica: An International Journal for Symbolic Logic, Volume 3, pp. 77–95
Grzegorczyk, Andrzej (1953): Some classes of recursive functions. Rozprawy Matematyczne, Volume 4, pp. 1–45
Grzegorczyk, Andrzej (1953): Konferencja logików. Myśl Filozoficzna, Volume 1, Issue 7, pp. 340–349
Grzegorczyk, Andrzej; Kuratowski, Kazimierz (1952): On Janiszewski's property of topological spaces. Annales de la Société Polonaise de Mathématique, Volume 25, pp. 69–82
Grzegorczyk, Andrzej (1951): Undecidability of Some Topological Theories. Fundamenta Mathematicae, Volume 38, pp. 137–152 
Grzegorczyk, Andrzej (1950): The Pragmatic Foundations of Semantics. Synthese, Volume 8, pp. 300–324. Republished in Przełęcki, Marian; Wójcicki, Ryszard (editors) (1977): Twenty-Five Years of Logical Methodology in Poland. D. Reidel, Boston & PWN–Polish Scientific Publishers, Warszawa, pp. 135–164 
Grzegorczyk, Andrzej (1948): Próba ugruntowania semantyki języka opisowego. Przegląd Filozoficzny, Volume 44, Issue 4, pp. 348–371

Other papers 
Grzegorczyk, Andrzej; Zdanowski, Konrad (2008): Undecidability and Concatenation. In Ehrenfeucht, Andrzej; Marek, Victor Witold; Srebrny, Marian (editors) (2008): Andrzej Mostowski and Foundational Studies. IOS Press, Amsterdam, pp. 72–91 
Grzegorczyk, Andrzej (2006): Empiryczne wyróżnienie duchowości. In Grzegorczyk, Anna; Sójka, Jacek; Koschany, Rafał (editors) (2006): Fenomen duchowości. Wydawnictwo Naukowe UAM, Poznań, pp. 29–34 
Grzegorczyk, Andrzej (2006): Prawda przemieniająca. In Grzegorczyk, Anna; Sójka, Jacek; Koschany, Rafał (editors) (2006): Fenomen duchowości. Wydawnictwo Naukowe UAM, Poznań, pp. 247–266 
Grzegorczyk, Andrzej (2005): Tezy europejskiej samoświadomości. In Góralski, Andrzej (editor) (2005): Życie pełne, dobrze urządzone a kultura doraźności: intelektualiści i młoda inteligencja w Europie przemian. Materiały VIII Międzynarodowej Konferencji PTU, Warszawa, 9–11 maja 2005 roku. Wspólnotowość i Postawa Uniwersalistyczna: Rocznik PTU 2004–2005, Number 4, pp. 18–25 
Grzegorczyk, Andrzek (2004): Używanie "rozumu" a stan aktualny ludzkości. In Wojnar, Irena; Kubin, Jerzy (editors) (2004): Bogdan Suchodolski w stulecie urodzin – trwałość inspiracji: zbiór studiów. Komitet Prognoz "Polska w XXI Wieku" przy Prezydium Polskiej Akademii Nauk, Warszawa, pp. 257–274 
Grzegorczyk, Andrzej (1999): Czasy i wyzwania. In Łaszczyk, Jan (editor) (1999): Pedagogika czasu przemian: praca zbiorowa. Wydawnictwo Zakładu Metodologii Wyższej Szkoły Pedagogiki Specjalnej, Warszawa, pp. 9–21 
Grzegorczyk, Andrzej (1996): Non-violence: wychowanie do negocjacji, demokracji i współistnienia. In Wojnar, Irena; Kubin, Jerzy (editors) (1996): Edukacja wobec wyzwań XXI wieku: zbiór studiów. Komitet Prognoz "Polska w XXI Wieku" przy Prezydium Polskiej Akademii Nauk & Dom Wydawniczy Elipsa, Warszawa, pp. 57–92 
Grzegorczyk, Andrzej (1993): Dekalog rozumu. In Omyła, Mieczysław (editor) (1994): Nauka i język: Marianowi Przełęckiemu w siedemdziesiątą rocznicę urodzin. Biblioteka Myśli Semiotycznej, Volume 32, edited by Pelc, Jerzy. Wydział Filozofii i Socjologii Uniwersytetu Warszawskiego, Warszawa & Znak-Język-Rzeczywistość: Polskie Towarzystwo Semiotyczne, pp. 81–85 
Grzegorczyk, Andrzej (1991): The Principle of Transcendence and the Foundation of Axiology. In Geach, Peter; Holowka, Jacek (editors) (1991): Logic and Ethics. Kluwer Academic Publishers, Dordrecht, pp. 71–78 
Grzegorczyk, Andrzej (1990): Moralistyczna wizja dziejów. In Ajnenkiel, Andrzej; Kuczyński, Janusz; Wohl, Andrzej (editors) (1990): Sens polskiej historii. Program Badań i Współtworzenia Filozofii Pokoju Uniwersytetu Warszawskiego, Warszawa, pp. 48–60 
Grzegorczyk, Andrzej (1989): Filozofia człowieka a pedagogika. In Doktór, Kazimierz; Hajduk, Edward (editors) (1989): Humanizm, prakseologia, pedagogika: materiały konferencji zorganizowanej dla upamiętnienia 100 rocznicy urodzin Tadeusza Kotarbińskiego. Wydawnictwo Instytutu Filozofii i Socjologii Polskiej Akademii Nauk, Warszawa & Zakład Narodowy imienia Ossolińskich: Wydawnictwo Polskiej Akademii Nauk, Wrocław, pp. 199–208
Grzegorczyk, Andrzej (1974): Axiomatic theory of enumeration. In Fenstad, Jens Erik; Hinman, Peter Greayer (editors) (1974): Generalized Recursion Theory: Proceedings of the 1972 Oslo Symposium. North Holland, Amsterdam, pp. 429–436 
In Laudet, Michel; Lacombe, Daniel; Nolin, Louis; Schützenberger, Marcel (editors) (1970): Symposium on Automatic Demonstration Held at Versailles/France, December 1968. Springer, Heidelberg, pp. 87–100
Grzegorczyk, Andrzej (1961): Axiomatizability of Geometry without Points. In Freudenthal, Hans (editor) (1961): The Concept and the Role of the Model in Mathematics and Natural and Social Sciences: Proceedings of the Colloquium sponsored by the Division of Philosophy of Sciences of the International Union of History and Philosophy of Sciences organized at Utrecht, January 1960. D. Reidel, Dordrecht, pp. 104–111 
Grzegorczyk, Andrzej (1960): Przerosty cywilizacyjne a wartości twórcze. In Czeżowski, Tadeusz (editor) (1960): Charisteria: Rozprawy filozoficzne złożone w darze Władysławowi Tatarkiewiczowi w siedemdziesiątą rocznicę urodzin. Państwowe Wydawnictwo Naukowe, Warszawa, pp. 97–107 
Grzegorczyk, Andrzej (1959): O pewnych formalnych konsekwencjach reizmu. In Kotarbińska, Janina; Ossowska, Maria; Pelc, Jerzy; Przełęcki, Marian; Szaniawski, Klemens (editors) (1959): Fragmenty filozoficzne, Seria Druga: Księga Pamiątkowa ku Uczczeniu Czterdziestolecia Pracy Nauczycielskiej w Uniwersytecie Warszawskim Profesora Tadeusza Kotarbińskiego. Państwowe Wydawnictwo Naukowe, Warszawa, pp. 7–14
Grzegorczyk, Andrzej (1959): Some Approaches to Constructive Analysis. In Heyting, Arend (editor) (1959): Constructivity in Mathematics: Proceedings of the Colloquium held at Amsterdam, 1957. North Holland, Amsterdam, pp. 43–61
Grzegorczyk, Andrzej (1949): Un Essai d'etablir la Sémantique du Langage Descriptif. In Beth, Evert Willem; Pos, Hendrik Josephus; Hollak, Johannes Hermanus Antonius (editors) (1949): Proceedings of the Tenth International Congress of Philosophy (Amsterdam, 11–18 August 1948), Volume 2. North Holland, Amsterdam, pp. 776–778

Gallery

See also
 List of Polish people

Sources 
Odintsov, Sergei Pavlovich (2018): Larisa Maksimova on Implication, Interpolation, and Definability. Springer International Publishing, Cham
Golińska-Pilarek, Joanna; Huuskonen, Taneli (2017): Grzegorczyk's non-Fregean logics and their formal properties. In Urbaniak, Rafał; Payette, Gillman (editors) (2017): Applications of Formal Philosophy: The Road Less Travelled. Springer International Publishing, Cham, Chapter 12, pp. 243–263
Brożek, Anna; Stadler, Friedrich; Woleński, Jan (editors) (2017): The Significance of the Lvov–Warsaw School in the European Culture. Springer International Publishing, Cham
Majewska, Lucyna (2017): Этическое творчество Анджея Гжегорчика (Andrzej Grzegorczyk's works in ethics). ВЕЧЕ: Журнал русской философии и культуры, Volume 29, pp. 285–295 (Publishing House of Saint Petersburg State University, Saint Petersburg)
Śliwerski, Bogusław (2016): O kluczowej dla pedagogiki twórczości filozofa Andrzeja Grzegorczyka. Blog Pedagog, 4 January 2016
Niwiński, Damian (2016): Contribution of Warsaw Logicians to Computational Logic. Axioms, Volume 5, Issue 16, 8 pages
Golińska-Pilarek, Joanna (2016): On the Minimal Non-Fregean Grzegorczyk Logic: To the Memory of Andrzej Grzegorczyk. Studia Logica: An International Journal for Symbolic Logic, Volume 104, Issue 2, pp. 209–234
Гірний, Олег Ігорович (Hirnyy, Oleg Igorovich) (2016): Анджей Гжегорчик як філософ освіти (Andrzej Grzegorczyk as a Philosopher of Education). Філософія освіти. Philosophy of Education, Issue 1, pp. 242–256
Visser, Albert (2016): The Second Incompleteness Theorem: Reflections and Rumination. In Horsten, Leon; Welch, Philip (editors) (2016): Gödel's Disjunction: The Scope and Limits of Mathematical Knowledge. Oxford University Press, Oxford, pp. 67–91
Huuskonen, Taneli (2015): Grzegorczyk's Logics: Part I. Formalized Mathematics, Volume 23, Issue 3, pp. 177–187
Huuskonen, Taneli (2015): Polish Notation. Formalized Mathematics, Volume 23, Issue 3, pp. 161–176
Biłat, Andrzej (2015): Non-Fregean Logics of Analytic Equivalence (II). Bulletin of the Section of Logic, Volume 44, Issue 1–2, pp. 69–79
Kładoczny, Piotr (2015): The Release and Rehabilitation of Victims of Stalinist Terror in Poland. In McDermott, Kevin; Stibbe, Matthew (editors) (2015): De-Stalinising Eastern Europe: The Rehabilitation of Stalin's Victims after 1953. Palgrave Macmillan, Basingstoke, pp. 67–86
Góralski, Andrzej (editor) (2015): Andrzej Grzegorczyk – Człowiek i dzieło. Biblioteka Dialogu. Universitas Rediviva, Warszawa
Woleński, Jan; Marek, Victor Witold (2015): Logic in Poland after 1945 (until 1975). European Review, Volume 23, pp. 159–197
Jankowska, Małgorzata (2015): Życie to wyzwanie: Pamięci Profesora Andrzeja Grzegorczyka. Kwartalnik Filozoficzny, Volume 43, Issue 1, pp. 5–13
Pelc, Jerzy (2015): Od wydawcy: Pożegnanie ze "Studiami Semiotycznymi". Studia Semiotyczne, Volume 28–29, pp. 5–30
Krajewski, Stanisław (2015): Andrzej Grzegorczyk (1922–2014). Studia Semiotyczne, Volume 28–29, pp. 63–88
Krajewski, Stanisław (2014): Andrzej Grzegorczyk (1922–2014). Wiadomości Matematyczne, Volume 50, Issue 1, pp. 171–173
Jankowska, Małgorzata (2014): Filozoficzne dekalogi – tekst dedykowany pamięci profesora Andrzeja Grzegorczyka (1922–2014). Zeszyty Naukowe Centrum Badań im. Edyty Stein, Number 12: Wobec Samotności, Wydawnictwo Naukowe UAM, Poznań, pp. 251–265
Trela, Grzegorz (2014): Logika – sprawa ludzka: Wspomnienie o profesorze Andrzeju Grzegorczyku (1922–2014). Argument, Volume 4, Number 2, pp. 491–498
Maksimova, Larisa Lvovna (2014): The Lyndon property and uniform interpolation over the Grzegorczyk logic. Siberian Mathematical Journal, Volume 55, Number 1, pp. 118–124 (translated from the Russian version)
Avigad, Jeremy; Brattka, Vasco (2014): Computability and Analysis: The Legacy of Alan Turing. In Downey, Rod (editor) (2014): Turing's Legacy: Developments from Turing's Ideas in Logic. Cambridge University Press, Cambridge, pp. 1–47
Duchliński, Piotr (2014): W stronę aporetycznej filozofii klasycznej: Konfrontacja tomizmu egzystencjalnego z wybranymi koncepcjami filozofii współczesnej. Akademia Ignatianum, Wydawnictwo WAM, Kraków
Murawski, Roman (2014): The Philosophy of Mathematics and Logic in the 1920s and 1930s in Poland. Birkhäuser, Basel
Urbaniak, Rafał (2014): Leśniewski's Systems of Logic and Foundations of Mathematics. Springer International Publishing, Cham
Kamiński, Łukasz; Waligóra, Grzegorz (editors) (2014): Kryptonim "Pegaz". Służba Bezpieczeństwa wobec Towarzystwa Kursów Naukowych 1978–1980. Instytut Pamięci Narodowej – Komisja Ścigania Zbrodni przeciwko Narodowi Polskiemu, Warszawa
Kamiński, Łukasz; Waligóra, Grzegorz (editors) (2014): Kryptonim Wasale: Służba bezpieczeństwa wobec studenckich komitetów Solidarności 1977–1980. Instytut Pamięci Narodowej – Komisja Ścigania Zbrodni przeciwko Narodowi Polskiemu, Warszawa
Feferman, Solomon (2013): About and around Computing over the Reals. In Copeland, Brian Jack; Posy, Carl; Shagrir, Oron (editors) (2013): Computability: Turing, Gödel, Church, and Beyond. MIT Press, Cambridge, Massachusetts, pp. 55–76
Mints, Grigori; Olkhovikov, Grigory; Urquhart, Alasdair (2013): Failure of Interpolation in Constant Domain Intuitionistic Logic. Journal of Symbolic Logic, Volume 78, Issue 3, pp. 937–950
Trzęsicki, Kazimierz; Krajewski, Stanisław; Woleński, Jan (editors) (2012): Papers on Logic and Rationality: Festschrift in Honour of Andrzej Grzegorczyk. Studies in Logic, Grammar and Rhetoric, Volume 27, Issue 40. University of Białystok, Białystok
Mikołajczuk, Agnieszka (2012): O życiu zawodowym i dokonaniach naukowych Profesor Renaty Grzegorczykowej. Etnolingwistyka, Volume 24, pp. 7–10
Tavana, Nazanin Roshandel; Weihrauch, Klaus (2011): Turing machines on represented sets, a model of computation for analysis. Logical Methods in Computer Science, Volume 7, Issue 2, pp. 1–21
Resnick, Rebecca Abigail (2011): Finding the best model for continuous computation. Senior Thesis, Harvard University, Cambridge
Woleński, Jan (2011): Jews in Polish Philosophy. Shofar: An Interdisciplinary Journal of Jewish Studies, Volume 29, Number 3, pp. 68–82 
Murawski, Roman (2011): Logos and Mathema: Studies in the Philosophy of Mathematics and History of Logic. Peter Lang, Frankfurt am Main
Murawski, Roman (2010): Essays in the Philosophy and History of Logic and Mathematics. Rodopi, Amsterdam
Čačić, Vedran; Pudlák, Pavel; Restall, Greg; Urquhart, Alasdair; Visser, Albert (2010): Decorated linear order types and the theory of concatenation. In Delon, Françoise; Kohlenbach, Ulrich; Maddy, Penelope; Stephan, Frank (editors) (2010): Logic Colloquium 2007. Lecture Notes in Logic, Volume 35. Association for Symbolic Logic, Cambridge University Press, Cambridge, pp. 1–13
Grzegorczyk, Franciszek (2010): Doktor Marian Borsuk — ordynator Oddziału Chirurgicznego Szpitala Wolskiego (1907–1923) (Marian Borsuk MD — head of Surgical Department, Wolski Hospital (1907–1923)). Pneumonologia i Alergologia Polska, Volume 78, Issue 4, pp. 306–309
Maksimova, Larisa Lvovna (2009): Restricted interpolation property in superintuitionistic logics. Algebra i Logika, Volume 48, Number 1, pp. 54–89
Švejdar, Vítězslav (2009): On Interpretability in the Theory of Concatenation. Notre Dame Journal of Formal Logic, Volume 50, Number 1, pp. 87–95
Barra, Matthias (2009): Notes on small inductively defined classes and the majorisation relation. Dissertation presented for the degree of Philosophiae Doctor (PhD), Department of Mathematics, University of Oslo, November 2009, supervised by Lars Kristiansen
Ehrenfeucht, Andrzej; Marek, Victor Witold; Srebrny, Marian (editors) (2008): Andrzej Mostowski and Foundational Studies. IOS Press, Amsterdam
Krajewski, Stanisław; Marek, Victor Witold; Mirkowska, Grażyna; Salwicki, Andrzej; Woleński, Jan (editors) (2008): Topics in Logic, Philosophy and Foundations of Mathematics and Computer Science: In Recognition of Professor Andrzej Grzegorczyk. Fundamenta Informaticae, Volume 81, Issue 1–3. IOS Press, Amsterdam
Krajewski, Stanisław (2008): Andrzej Grzegorczyk – logika i religia, samotność i solidarność. Wiadomości Matematyczne, Volume 44, Number 01, pp. 53–59
Matuszewski, Roman; Zalewska, Anna (editors) (2007): From Insight to Proof: Festschrift in Honour of Andrzej Trybulec. Studies of Logic, Grammar, and Rhetoric, Volume 10, Issue 23
Švejdar, Vítězslav (2007): An interpretation of Robinson's Arithmetic in its Grzegorczyk's weaker variant. Fundamenta Informaticae, Volume 81, Issue 1–3, pp. 347–354
Maksimova, Larisa Lvovna (2006): Projective Beth Property in Extensions of Grzegorczyk Logic. Studia Logica: An International Journal for Symbolic Logic, Volume 83, pp. 365–391
Eisler, Jerzy Krzysztof (2006): Polski rok 1968. Instytut Pamięci Narodowej – Komisja Ścigania Zbrodni przeciwko Narodowi Polskiemu, Warszawa
Jadacki, Jacek Juliusz (2006): The Lvov–Warsaw School and Its Influence on Polish Philosophy of the Second Half of the 20th Century. In Jadacki, Jacek Juliusz and Paśniczek, Jacek (editors): The Lvov–Warsaw School – The New Generation. Rodopi, Amsterdam, pp. 41–83
Trzęsicki, Kazimierz (2006): Wkład logików polskich w światową informatykę. Filozofia Nauki – kwartalnik, Volume 14, Issue 3, pp. 5–19
Zieliński, Wojciech (2006): W poszukiwaniu filozofii znaczącej (uwagi na marginesie dyskusji). Diametros, Issue 10, pp. 78–92
Kostrzycka, Zofia (2006): Density of truth in modal logics. Discrete Mathematics and Theoretical Computer Science Proceedings Volume AG Fourth Colloquium on Mathematics and Computer Science: Algorithms, Trees, Combinatorics and Probabilities, Nancy, France pp. 161–170
Hainry, Emmanuel (2006): Modèles de calcul sur les réels, résultats de comparaison. Doctoral thesis, Institut National Polytechnique de Lorraine, Laboratoire Lorrain de Recherche en Informatique et ses Applications – UMR 7503, supervised by Olivier Bournez
Bournez, Olivier; Hainry, Emmanuel (2005): Elementarily computable functions over the real numbers and -sub-recursive functions. Theoretical Computer Science, Volume 348, Issues 2–3, pp. 130–147
Gawor, Leszek; Zdybel, Lech (2005): Elements of Twentieth Century Polish Ethics. In Jedynak, Stanisław (editor) (2005): Polish Axiology: The 20th Century and Beyond. Polish Philosophical Studies V. The Council for Research in Values and philosophy, Washington, D.C., Chapter II, pp. 37–61
ERCOM: Stefan Banach International Mathematical Center. Newsletter of European Mathematical Society, Issue 58, December 2005, pp. 37–38
Gabbay, Dov; Maksimova, Larisa Lvovna (2005): Interpolation and Definability: Modal and Intuitionistic Logic. Oxford University Press, Oxford
Maksimova, Larisa Lvovna (2004): Definability in Normal Extensions of S4. Algebra i Logika, Volume 43, Number 4, pp. 387–410
Wybraniec-Skardowska, Urszula (2004): Foundations for the formalization of metamathematics and axiomatizations of consequence theories. Annals of Pure and Applied Logic, Volume 127, pp 243–266
Jeřábek, Emil (2004): A note on Grzegorczyk's logic. Mathematical Logic Quarterly, Volume 50, Number 3, pp. 295–296 
Szałas, Andrzej Piotr (2004): Logic for Computer Science. Lecture Notes. October 2004 
Hasuo, Ichiro; Kashima, Ryo (2003): Kripke Completeness of First-Order Constructive Logics with Strong Negation. Logic Journal of the IGPL, Volume 11, Issue 6, pp. 615–646 
Wójcicki, Ryszard; Zygmunt, Jan (2003): Polish Logic in Postwar Period. In Hendricks, Vincent Fella; Malinowski, Jacek (editors) (2003): Trends in Logic: 50 Years of Studia Logica. Kluwer Academic Publishers, Dordrecht, pp. 11–33 
Mackiewicz, Witold (2003): Ludzie i Idee: Polska filozofia najnowsza. Zarys problematyki. Agencja Wydawniczo-Poligraficzna "Witmark", Warszawa 
Jaworowski, Zbigniew (2003): Eurocentrism. Res Humana, Number 1, Issue 62, pp. 11–15. Republished in The Polish Foreign Affairs Digest: Quarterly, Volume 3, Number 2, Issue 7, pp. 29–37 
Słowik, Zdzisław (2002): O duchu Europy i jej powołaniu: Rozmowa z profesorem Andrzejem Grzegorczykiem. Res Humana, Number 4, Issue 59, pp. 24–28 
Chmurzyński, Jerzy Andrzej (2002): Searching Europe's Destination. Dialogue and Universalism, Number 6-7, pp. 133–144 
Ciesielski, Remigiusz Tadeusz (2002): Sens Europy. Kultura Współczesna: Teorie, Interpretacje, Praktyka, Issue 3–4, pp. 111–117 
Fiorentini, Camillo; Miglioli, Pierangelo (1999): A Cut-free Sequent Calculus for the Logic of Constant Domains with a Limited Amount of Duplications. Logic Journal of the IGPL, Volume 7, Issue 6, pp. 733–753 
Wiśniewski, Ryszard; Tyburski, Włodzimierz (editors) (1999): Polska filozofia analityczna: W kręgu szkoły lwowsko-warszawskiej. Wydawnictwo Naukowe Uniwersytetu Mikołaja Kopernika, Toruń 
Murawski, Roman (1999): Recursive Functions and Metamathematics: Problems of Completeness and Decidability, Gödel's theorems. Kluwer Academic Publishers, Dordrecht
Woleński, Jan; Köhler, Eckehart (editors) (1999): Alfred Tarski and the Vienna Circle: Austro–Polish Connections in Logical Empiricism. Kluwer Academic Publishers, Dordrecht
Kijania-Placek, Katarzyna; Woleński, Jan (editors) (1998):The Lvov–Warsaw School and Contemporary philosophy. Kluwer Academic Publishers, Dordrecht
Srzednicki, Jan Tadeusz Jerzy; Stachniak, Zbigniew (editors) (1998): Leśniewski's Systems Protothetic. Kluwer Academic Publishers, Dordrecht
Weihrauch, Klaus (1997): A Foundation for Computable Analysis. In Freksa, Christian; Jantzen, Matthias; Valk, Rüdiger (editors) (1997): Foundations of Computer Science: Potential-Theory-Cognition. Springer, Heidelberg, pp. 185–199
Kaczor, Anna (1997): Perspektywy edukacji. Przegląd Humanistyczny, Volume 41, Number 3, Issue 342, pp. 188–193
Jadacki, Jacek Juliusz (1996): The Conceptual System of the Lvov–Warsaw School. Axiomathes, Number 3, pp. 325–333
Błaszczyk, Jolanta (1994): Dziewięć Lat Warszawskiej Premiery Literackiej (Nine years of the Warsaw Literary Award). Bibliotekarz, Issue 3, pp. 25–27
Mardaev, Sergei Il'ich (1993): Least fixed points in Grzegorczyk's logic and in the intuitionistic propositional logic. Algebra and Logic, Volume 32, Issue 5, pp. 279–288
Boolos, George (1993): The Logic of Provability. Cambridge University Press, Cambridge
Woleński, Jan (editor) (1990): Philosophical Logic in Poland. Kluwer Academic Publishers, Dordrecht
Woleński, Jan (editor) (1990): Kotarbiński: Logic, Semantics and Ontology. Kluwer Academic Publishers, Dordrecht
Woleński, Jan (1989): Logic and Philosophy in the Lvov–Warsaw School. Kluwer Academic Publishers, Dordrecht
Maryniarczyk, Andrzej (1989): Filozofia naukowa czy kolejny zabobon?. Ethos: Kwartalnik Instytutu Jana Pawła II KUL, Volume 2, Number 8, pp. 332–337
Srzednicki, Jan Tadeusz Jerzy; Rickey, Vincent Frederick; Czelakowski, Janusz (editors) (1984): Leśniewski's Systems: Ontology and Mereology. Martinus Nijhoff Publishers, The Hague & Ossolineum: Publishing House of the Polish Academy of Sciences, Wrocław
Gabbay, Dov; Guenthner, Franz (editors) (1984): Handbook of Philosophical Logic, Volume II: Extensions of Classical Logic. D. Reidel, Dordrecht
Paris, Jeffrey Bruce; Wilkie, Alex James (1984):  sets and induction. In Guzicki, Wojciech; Marek, Wiktor Witold; Pelc, Andrzej; Rauszer, Cecylia (editors) (1984): Open Days in Model Theory and Set Theory: Proceedings of a Conference held in September 1981 at Jadwisin, near Warsaw, Poland. University of Leeds, Leeds, pp. 237–248
Cichoń, Eugeniusz Adam; Wainer, Stanley Scott (1983): The Slow-Growing and the Grzegorczyk Hierarchies. Journal of Symbolic Logic, Volume 48, Issue 2, pp. 399–408 
Boolos, George (1980): Provability in arithmetic and a schema of Grzegorczyk. Fundamenta Mathematicae, Volume 60, Number 1, pp. 41–45
Boolos, George (1979): The Unprovability of Consistency: An Essay in Modal Logic. Cambridge University Press, Cambridge
Hass, Ludwik (1979): Wolnomularze i loże wolnomularskie Płocka (1803–1821). Rocznik Mazowiecki, Volume 7, pp. 69–126
Tatarkiewicz, Teresa; Tatarkiewicz, Władysław (1979): Wspomnienia. Państwowy Instytut Wydawniczy, Warszawa
Mostowski, Andrzej (1979): Thirty Years of Foundational Studies: Lectures on the Development of Mathematical Logic and the Study of the Foundations of Mathematics in 1930–1964. In Kuratowski, Kazimierz; Marek, Wiktor Witold; Pacholski, Leszek; Rasiowa, Helena; Ryll-Nardzewski, Czesław; Zbierski, Paweł (editors): Andrzej Mostowski: Foundational Studies, Selected Works, Volume I. North-Holland, Amsterdam & PWN–Polish Scientific Publishers, Warszawa, pp. 1–176
Chomsky, Noam (1977): The Right to Help: Noam Chomsky and Andrzej Grzegorczyk. The New York Review of Books, 4 August 1977.
Ptaczek, Józef (editor) (1976): Memoriał 59, inne dokumenty protestu oraz list otwarty prof. dr Edwarda Lipińskiego do Gierka. Wydawnictwo Komitetu Głównego P.P.S. w Niemczech, Munich
Wainer, Stanley Scott (1972): Ordinal Recursion, and a Refinement of the Extended Grzegorczyk Hierarchy. Journal of Symbolic Logic, Volume 37, Issue 2, pp. 281–292 
Segerberg, Karl Krister (1971): An Essay in Classical Modal Logic. PhD dissertation under Dana Stewart Scott, Stanford University. Filosofiska Studier utgivna av Filosofiska Föreningen och Filosofiska Institutionen vid Uppsala Universitet, Number 13, Uppsala, 1971
Klemke, Dieter (1971): Ein Henkin-Beweis für die Vollständigkeit eines Kalküls relativ zur Grzegorczyk-Semantik. Archiv für Mathematische Logik und Grundlagenforschung, Volume 14, pp. 148–161
Görnemann, Sabine (1971): A logic stronger than intuitionism. Journal of Symbolic Logic, Volume 36, Issue 2, pp. 249–261
Klemke, Dieter (1970): Ein vollständiger Kalkül für die Folgerungsbeziehung der Grzegorczyk-Semantik. Dissertation, Albert-Ludwigs-Universität Freiburg im Breisgau, Naturwissenschaftlich-Mathematische Fakultät
Görnemann, Sabine (1969): Über eine Verschärfung der intuitionistischen Logik. Proefschrift, Technische Hochschule Hannover, Fakultät für Mathematik und Naturwissenschaft
Gabbay, Dov (1969): Montague Type Semantics for Non-Classical Logics I. U.S. Air Force Office of Scientific Research, contract No. F 61052-68-C-0036, Report No. 4
Kostanecki, Stanisław (1969): Mirosław Zdziarski (1892–1939). Rocznik Mazowiecki, Volume 2, pp. 309–339
Starnawski, Jerzy (1969): Piotr Grzegorczyk (17 listopada 1894 – 20 maja 1968). Pamiętnik Literacki: Czasopismo kwartalne poświęcone historii i krytyce literatury polskiej, Volume 60, Issue 2, pp. 409–415
Addison, John West; Henkin, Leon; Tarski, Alfred (editors) (1965): The Theory of Models: Proceedings of the 1963 International Symposium at Berkeley. North-Holland, Amsterdam
Jordan, Zbigniew Antoni (1963): Philosophy and Ideology: The Development of Philosophy and Marxism-Leninism in Poland since the Second World War. D. Reidel, Dordrecht
Luschei, Eugene Charles (1962): The Logical Systems of Lesniewski. North-Holland, Amsterdam
Czeżowski, Tadeusz (editor) (1960): Charisteria: Rozprawy filozoficzne złożone w darze Władysławowi Tatarkiewiczowi w siedemdziesiątą rocznicę urodzin. Państwowe Wydawnictwo Naukowe, Warszawa
Załęski, Stanisław (1908): O masonii w Polsce od roku 1738 do 1822: na źródłach wyłącznie masońskich. Druk W.L. Anczyca i Spółki, Kraków
Wójcicki, Kazimierz Władysław (1858): Cmentarz Powązkowski oraz cmentarze katolickie i innych wyznań pod Warszawą i w okolicach tegoż miasta, Tom III. Drukarnia S. Orgelbranda, Warszawa

External links 
Andrzej Grzegorczyk profile at Mathematics Genealogy Project
Andrzej Grzegorczyk's Warsaw Uprising biogram (in Polish)
Andrzej Grzegorczyk's obituary (in Polish) by Polish Mathematical Society
Andrzej Grzegorczyk's profile by Calculemus
2012 Interview with Andrzej Grzegorczyk (in Polish)
Andrzej Grzegorczyk's 90th birthday at the Warsaw branch of the Polish Philosophical Society 
Andrzej Grzegorczyk's lecture on 17 May 2011, the University of Opole, Poland 
2006 Appeal of the Polish Science Representatives to the Minister of Environment Jan Szyszko in Defense of the Tatra Mountains (in Polish)

1922 births
20th-century Polish mathematicians
21st-century Polish mathematicians
Computability theorists
Mathematical logicians
Polish mathematicians
Polish logicians
Warsaw Uprising insurgents
Home Army members
Knights of the Order of Polonia Restituta
Officers of the Order of Polonia Restituta
Recipients of the Order of Polonia Restituta
Christian ethicists
Catholic philosophers
Polish Christians
2014 deaths
20th-century Polish philosophers
21st-century Polish philosophers